= Islam in Russia =

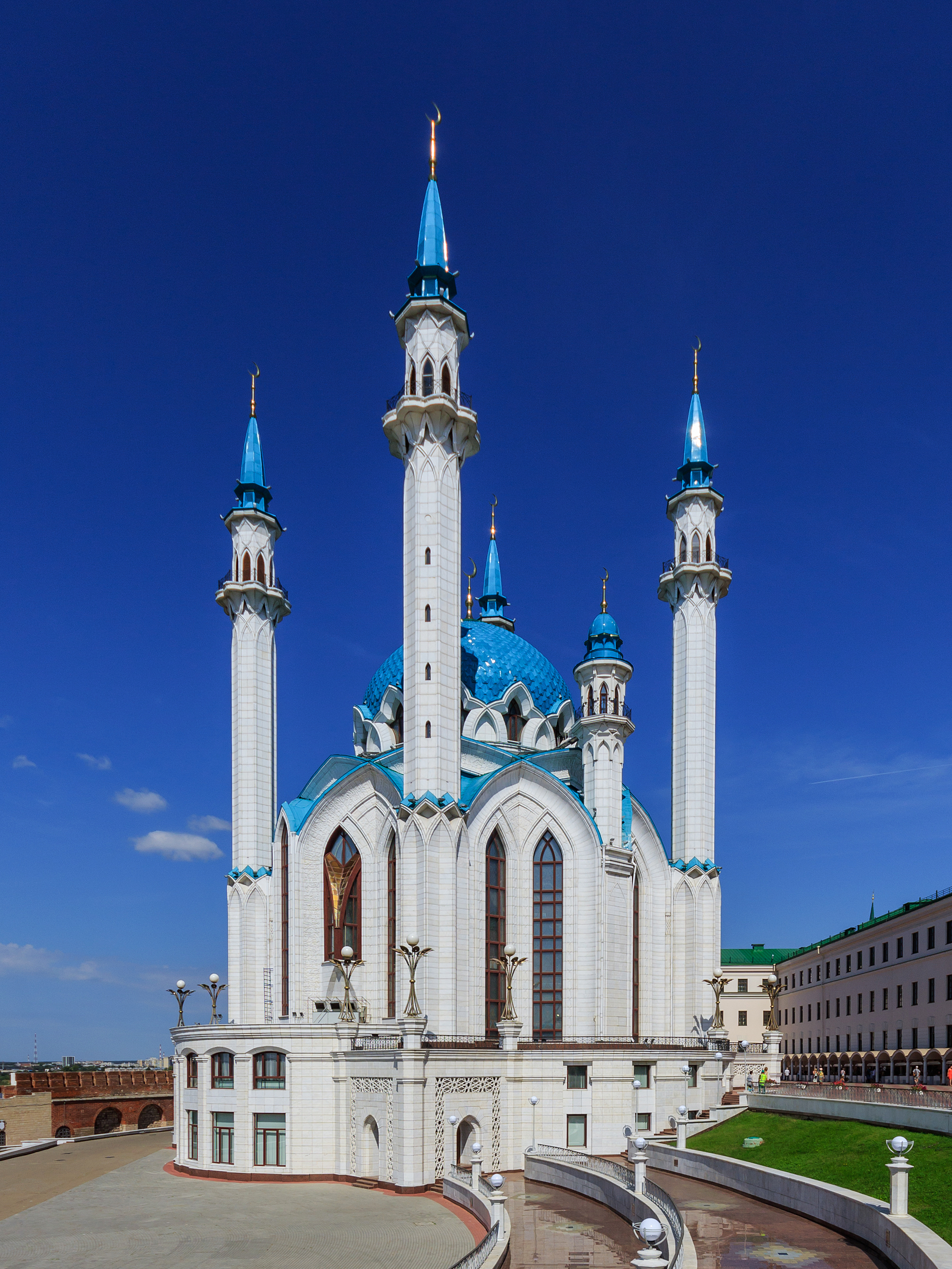
- Kul Sharif Mosque

Total population
- ▲20,000,000

Regions with significant populations
- North Caucasus, Tatarstan, Bashkortostan, Moscow

Religions
- Sunni Islam (predominantly), Shia Islam

Languages
- Russian and regional

Islam is the second-largest religion in the Russian Federation, which has the largest Muslim population in Europe. The Russian state-owned news agency TASS reported in 2015, citing the Mufti Council, that there were approximately 20 million Muslims among Russia's population of 146 million.

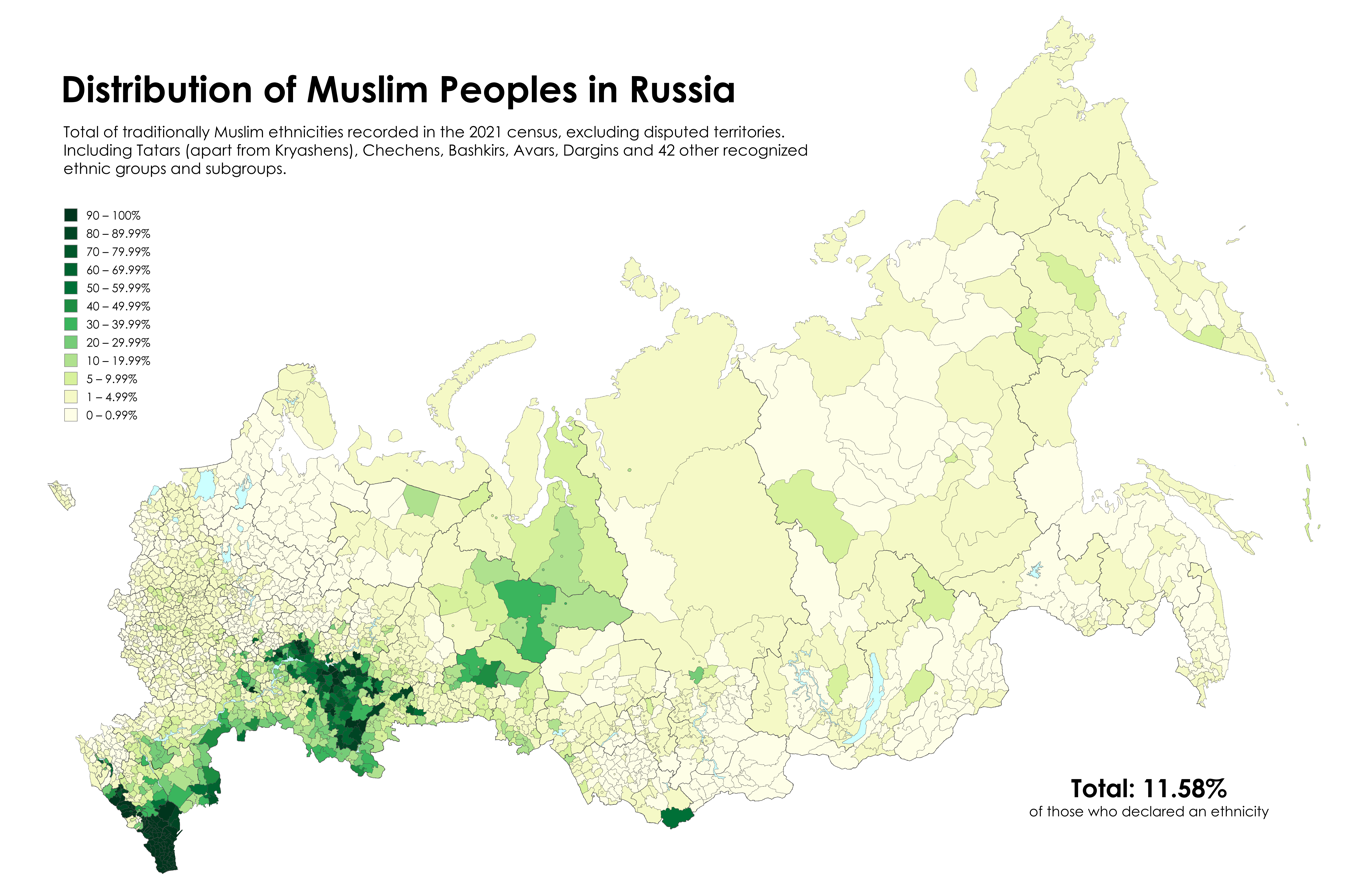
Map showing the distribution of Muslim ethnic communities at municipality level, based on the results of the 2021 Russian census

Recognized under the law and by Russian political leaders as one of Russia's traditional religions, Islam is a part of Russian historical heritage, and is subsidized by the Russian government. The position of Islam as a major Russian religion, alongside Orthodox Christianity, dates from the time of Catherine the Great, who sponsored Islamic clerics and scholarship through the Orenburg Assembly.

The history of Islam and Russia encompasses periods of conflict between the Muslim minority and the Orthodox majority, as well as periods of collaboration and mutual support. Robert Crews's study of Muslims living under the Tsar indicates that "the mass of Muslims" was loyal to that regime after Catherine, and sided with it over the Ottoman Empire. After the Russian Empire fell, the Soviet Union introduced a policy of state atheism, which impeded the practice of Islam and other religions and led to the execution and suppression of various Muslim leaders. Following the collapse of the Soviet Union, Islam regained a legally recognized space in Russian politics. Despite having made Islamophobic comments during the Second Chechen War, President Vladimir Putin has since subsidized mosques and Islamic education, which he called an "integral part of Russia's cultural code", and encouraged immigration from Muslim-majority former Soviet states.

Muslims form a majority of the population of the republics of Tatarstan and Bashkortostan in the Volga Federal District and predominate among the nationalities in the North Caucasian Federal District located between the Black Sea and the Caspian Sea: the Circassians, Balkars, Chechens, Ingush, Kabardin, Karachay, and numerous Dagestani peoples. Also, in the middle of the Volga Region reside populations of Tatars and Bashkirs, the vast majority of whom are Muslims. Other areas with notable Muslim minorities include Moscow, Saint Petersburg, the republics of Adygea, North Ossetia-Alania and Astrakhan, Moscow, Orenburg and Ulyanovsk oblasts. There are over 8,000 registered religious Muslim organizations, equivalent to almost one fifth of the number of registered Russian Orthodox religious organizations of about 42,000 as of 2022.

== History ==
Map of the Caucasus region c. 740. Derbent was conquered by the Umayyad Caliphate.

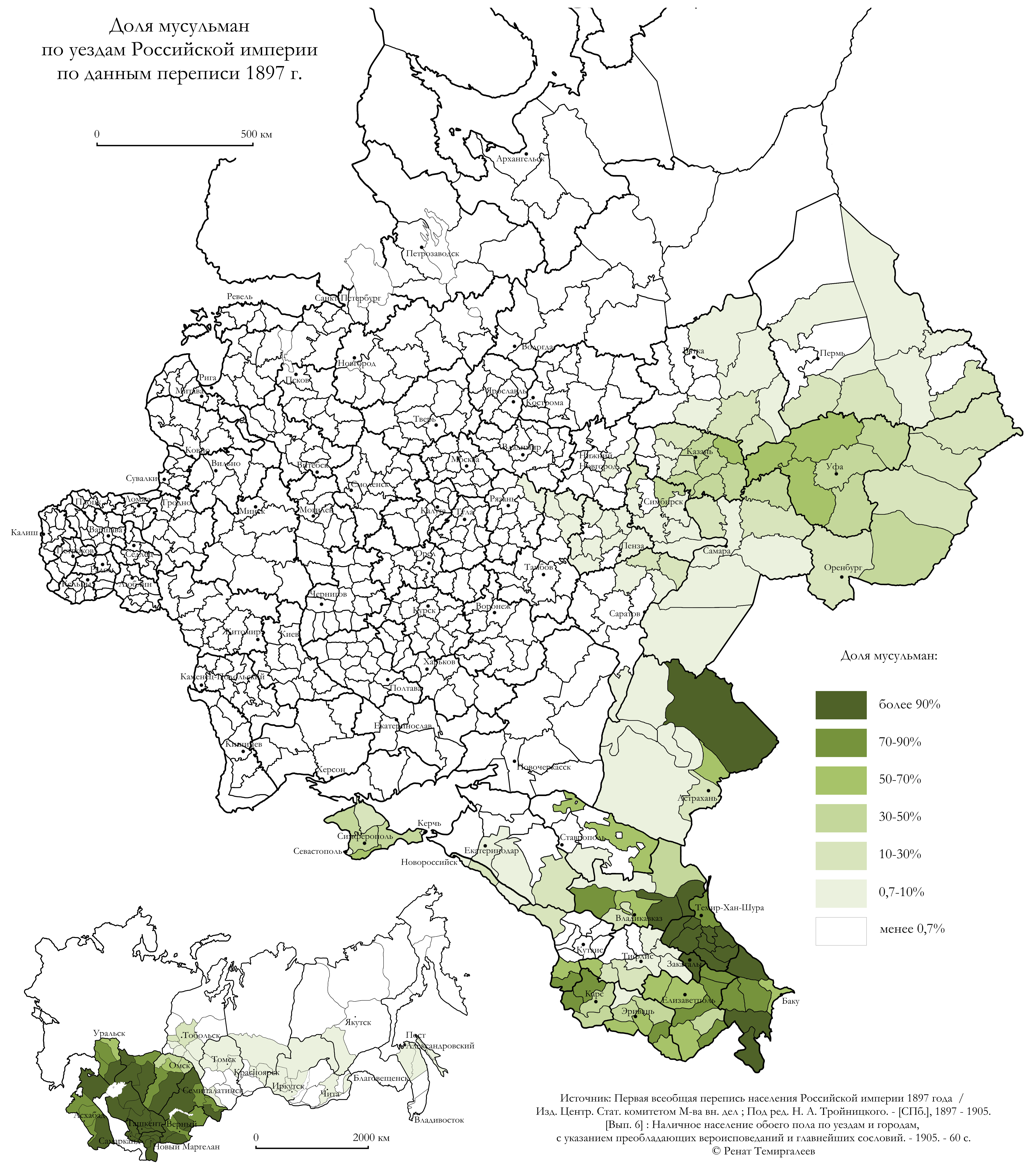
Share of Muslims by uezds and districts of the Russian Empire, according to the First General Census of 1897.

In the mid-7th century AD, as part of the Muslim conquest of Persia, Islam was introduced to the Caucasus region, parts of which were later permanently incorporated by Russia. The first people to become Muslims within current Russian territory, the Dagestani people (region of Derbent), converted after the Arab conquest of the region in the 8th century. The first Muslim state in the future Russian lands was Volga Bulgaria. In 922, the Tatars of the Khanate of Kazan inherited the population of believers from that state. Later most of the European and Caucasian Turkic peoples also became followers of Islam. The Mongol rulers of the Golden Horde were Muslims from 1313. By the 1330s, three of the four major khanates of the Mongol Empire had become Muslim.

The Tatars of the Crimean Khanate, the last remaining successor to the Golden Horde, continued to raid Southern Russia and burnt down parts of Moscow in 1571. Until the late 18th century, the Crimean Tatars maintained the massive Crimean slave trade with the Ottoman Empire and the Middle East, exporting about 2 million slaves from Russia and Ukraine over the period 1500–1700.

From the early 16th century up to and including the 19th century, all of Transcaucasia and southern Dagestan was ruled by various successive Iranian empires (the Safavids, Afsharids, and the Qajars), and their geopolitical and ideological neighboring arch-rivals, on the other hand, the Ottoman Turks. In the respective areas they ruled, in both the North Caucasus and South Caucasus, Shia Islam and Sunni Islam spread, resulting in a fast and steady conversion of many more ethnic Caucasian peoples in adjacent territories.

The period from the Russian conquest of Kazan in 1552 by Ivan the Terrible to the ascension of Catherine the Great in 1762 featured systematic Russian repression of Muslims through policies of exclusion and discrimination - as well as the destruction of Muslim culture by the elimination of outward manifestations of Islam such as mosques. The Russians initially demonstrated a willingness in allowing Islam to flourish as Muslim clerics were invited into the various regions to preach to the Muslims, particularly the Kazakhs, whom the Russians viewed with contempt. However, Russian policy shifted toward weakening Islam by introducing pre-Islamic elements of collective consciousness. Such attempts included methods of eulogizing pre-Islamic historical figures and imposing a sense of inferiority by sending Kazakhs to highly élite Russian military institutions. In response, Kazakh religious leaders attempted to bring religious fervor by espousing pan-Turkism, though many were persecuted as a result. The government of Russia paid Islamic scholars from the Ural-Volga area working among the Kazakhs

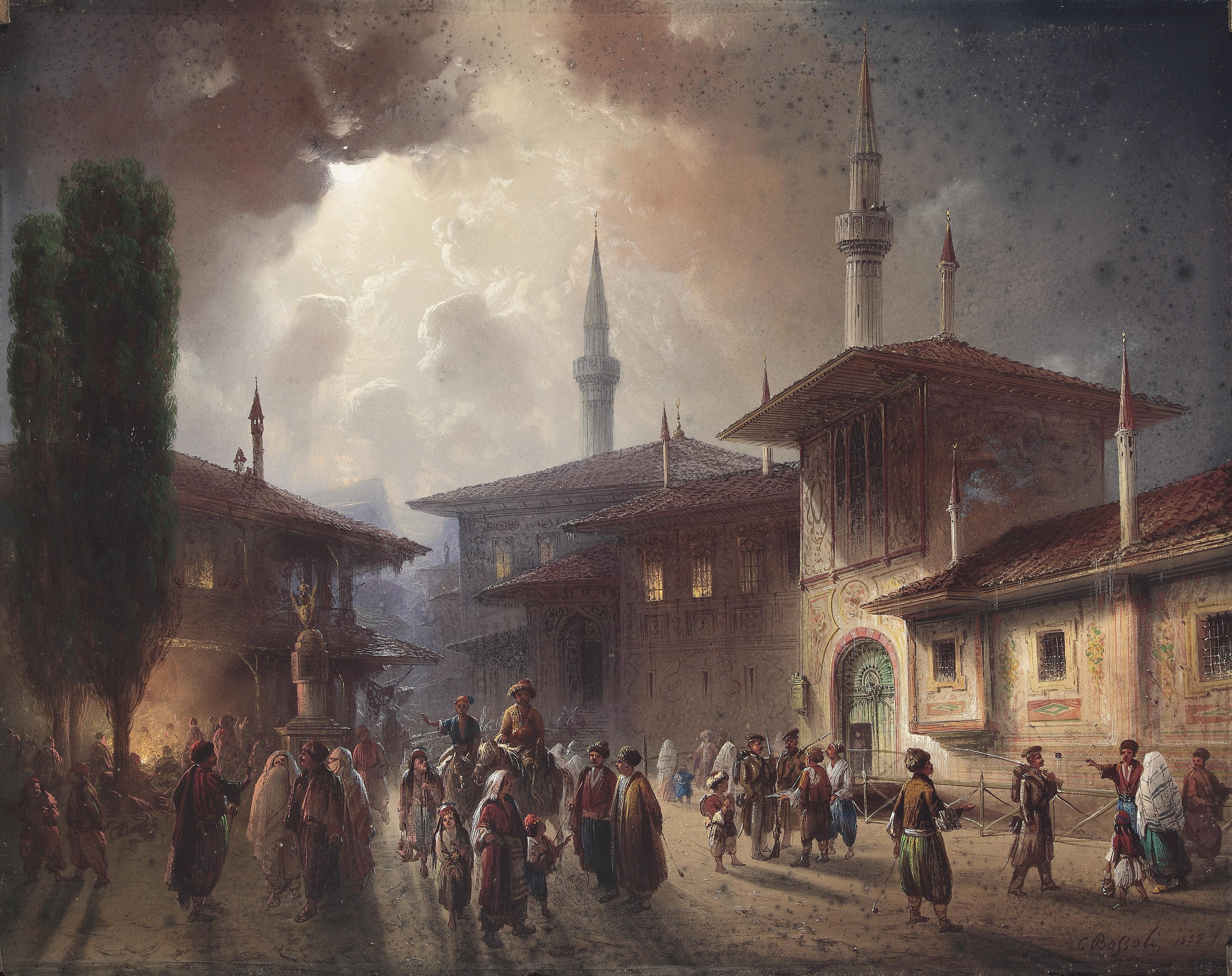
The Crimean Khan's Palace in Bakhchysarai in 1857. Crimea was conquered by the Russian Empire in 1783.

Islamic slavery did not have racial restrictions, but only war prisoners were considered slaves according to the Quran. Germans, Poles, and Lithuanians were allowed to be sold to Crimean Tatars in Moscow. In 1665, Tatars were allowed to buy Polish and Lithuanian slaves from the Russians (for the Crimean slave trade). Before 1649, Russians could be sold to Muslims under Russian law in Moscow. This contrasted with other places in Europe outside Russia where Muslims were not allowed to own Christians.

The Cossack Hetmanate recruited and incorporated Muslim Mishar Tatars. Cossack rank was awarded to Bashkirs. Muslim Turkics and Buddhist Kalmyks served as Cossacks. The Cossack Ural, Terek, Astrakhan, and Don Cossack hosts had Kalmyks in their ranks. Mishar Muslims, Teptiar Muslims, service Tatar Muslims, and Bashkir Muslims joined the Orenburg Cossack Host. Cossack non-Muslims shared the same status with Siberian Cossack Muslims. Muslim Cossacks in Siberia requested an Imam. Cossacks in Siberia included Tatar Muslims like in Bashkiria.

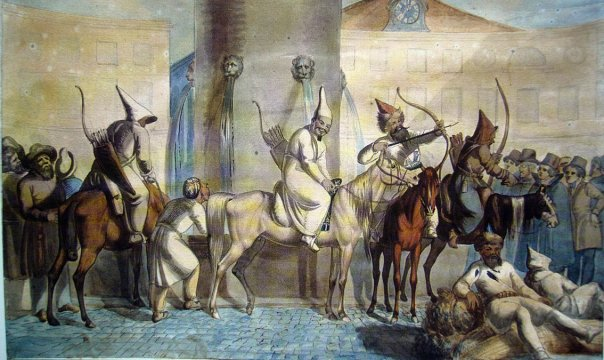
Bashkirs in Paris during the Napoleonic Wars, 1814

Bashkirs and Kalmyks in the Imperial Russian Army fought against Napoleon's Grande Armée during the French invasion of Russia. They were judged suitable for inundating opponents but not intense fighting. They were in a non-standard capacity in the military. Arrows, bows, and melee combat weapons were wielded by the Muslim Bashkirs. Bashkir women fought among the regiments. Denis Davidov mentioned the arrows and bows wielded by the Bashkirs. Napoleon's forces faced off against Kalmyks on horseback. Napoleon faced light mounted Bashkir forces. Mounted Kalmyks and Bashkirs numbering 100 were available to Russian commandants during the war against Napoleon. Kalmyks and Bashkirs served in the Russian army in France. A nachalnik was present in every one of the 11 cantons of the Bashkir host which was created by Russia after the Pugachev Rebellion. Bashkirs had the military statute of 1874 applied to them. Muslims were exempt from military conscription during World War I.

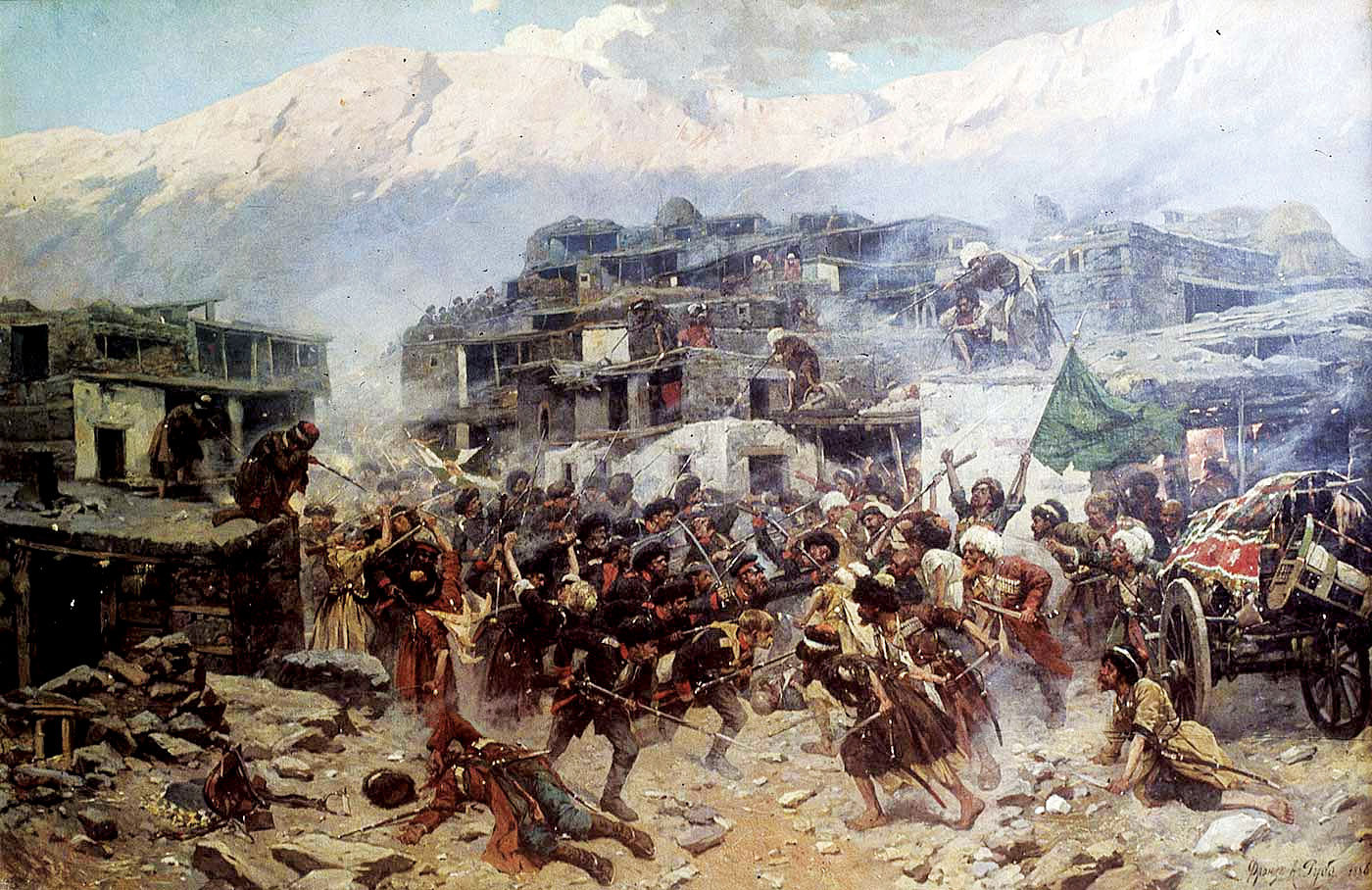
Fighting in the mountains of Dagestan during the Murid War

While total expulsion (as practiced in other Christian nations such as Spain, Portugal and Sicily) was not feasible to achieve a homogeneous Russian-Orthodox population, other policies such as land grants and the promotion of migration by other Russian and non-Muslim populations into Muslim lands displaced many Muslims, making them minorities in places such as some parts of the South Ural region and encouraging emigration to other parts such as the Ottoman Empire and neighboring Persia, and almost annihilating the Circassians, Crimean Tatars, and various Muslims of the Caucasus. The Russian army rounded up people, driving Muslims from their villages to ports on the Black Sea, where they awaited ships provided by the neighboring Ottoman Empire. The explicit Russian goal involved expelling the groups in question from their lands. They were given a choice as to where to be resettled: in the Ottoman Empire, in Persia, or Russia far from their old lands. The Russo-Circassian War ended with the signing of loyalty oaths by Circassian leaders on 2 June [O.S. 21 May] 1864. Afterward, the Ottoman Empire offered to harbor the Circassians who did not wish to accept the rule of a Christian monarch, and many emigrated to Anatolia (the heart of the Ottoman Empire) and ended up in modern Turkey, Syria, Jordan, Palestine, Iraq, and Kosovo. Many other Caucasian Muslims ended up in neighboring Iran - sizeable numbers of Shia Lezgins, Azerbaijanis, Muslim Georgians, Kabardins, and Laks. Various Russian, Caucasus, and Western historians agree on the figure of c. 500,000 inhabitants of the highland Caucasus being deported by Russia in the 1860s. A large proportion of them died in transit from disease. Those that remained loyal to Russia were settled into the lowlands, on the left bank of the Kuban' River. The trend of Russification has continued at different paces in the rest of Tsarist and Soviet periods, so that as of 2014 more Tatars lived outside the Republic of Tatarstan than inside it.

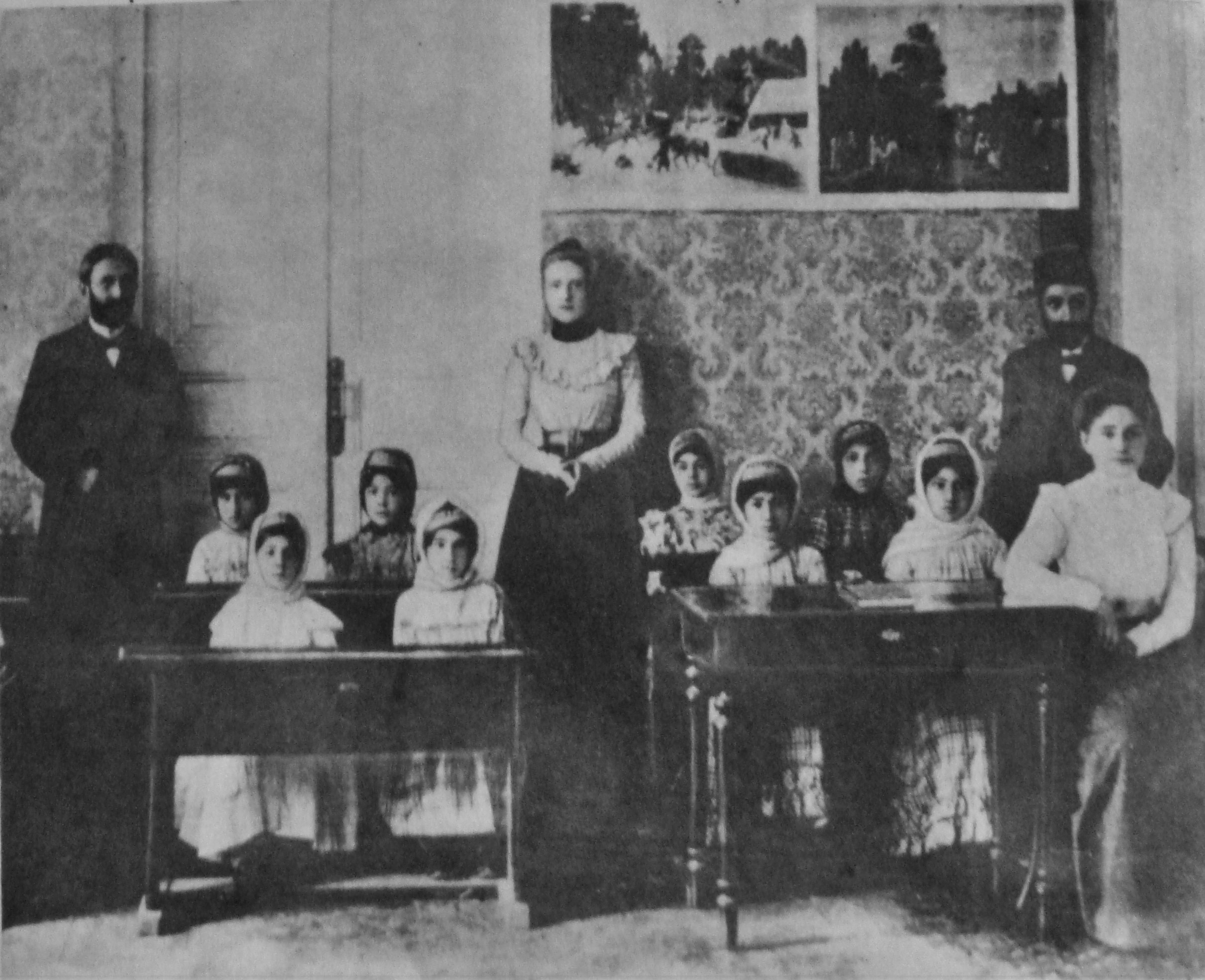
Students and staff of the Erivan Russian-Muslim School for Girls, 1902

A policy of deliberately enforcing anti-modern, traditional, ancient conservative Islamic education in schools and Islamic ideology was enforced by the Russians in order to deliberately hamper and destroy opposition to their rule by keeping them in a state of torpor to and prevent foreign ideologies from penetrating in.

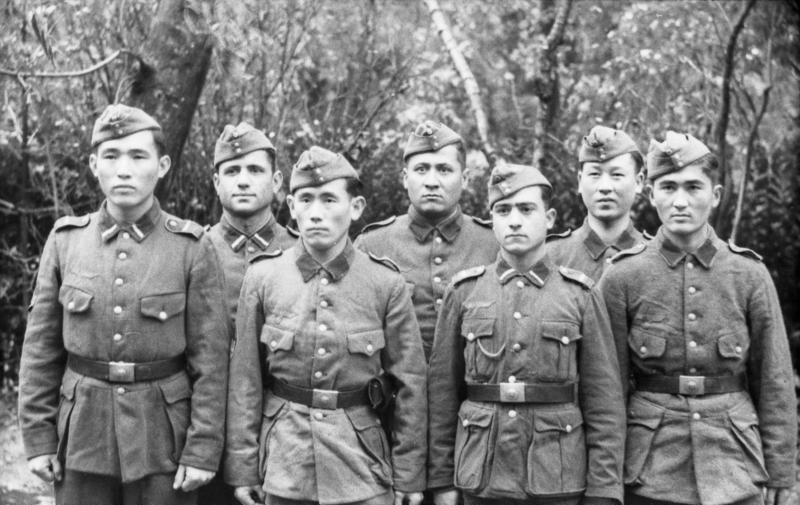
Captured Soviet soldiers of Muslim backgrounds volunteered in large numbers for the Ostlegionen of the Wehrmacht.

Communist rule oppressed and suppressed Islam, like other religions in the Soviet Union. Many mosques (for some estimates, more than 83% in Tatarstan) were closed. For example, the Märcani Mosque was the only acting mosque in Kazan at that time.

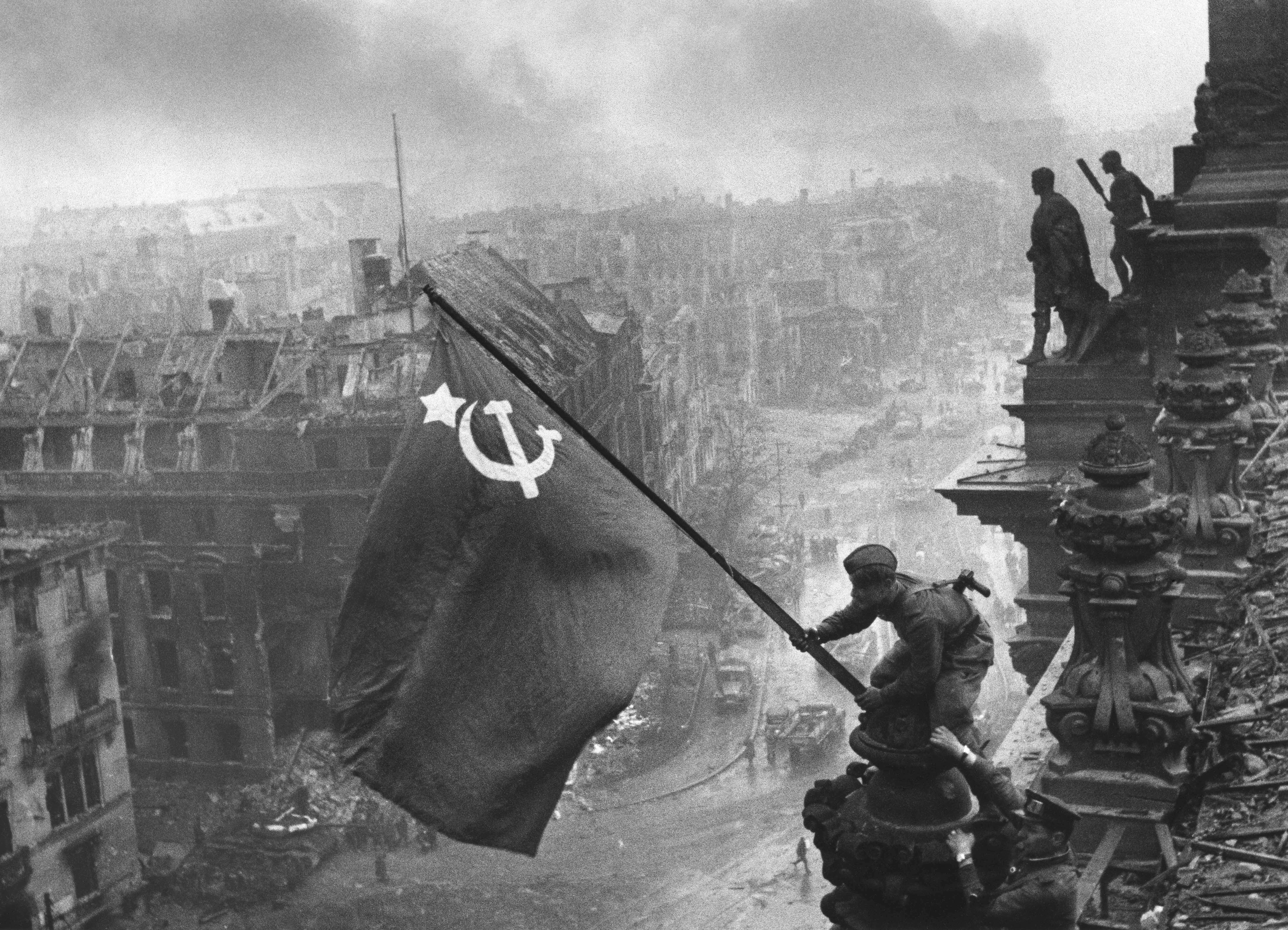
Abdulkhakim Ismailov is seen assisting in raising the flag in the iconic "Raising a flag over the Reichstag" photo by Yevgeny Khaldei.

== Islam in the post-Soviet period ==
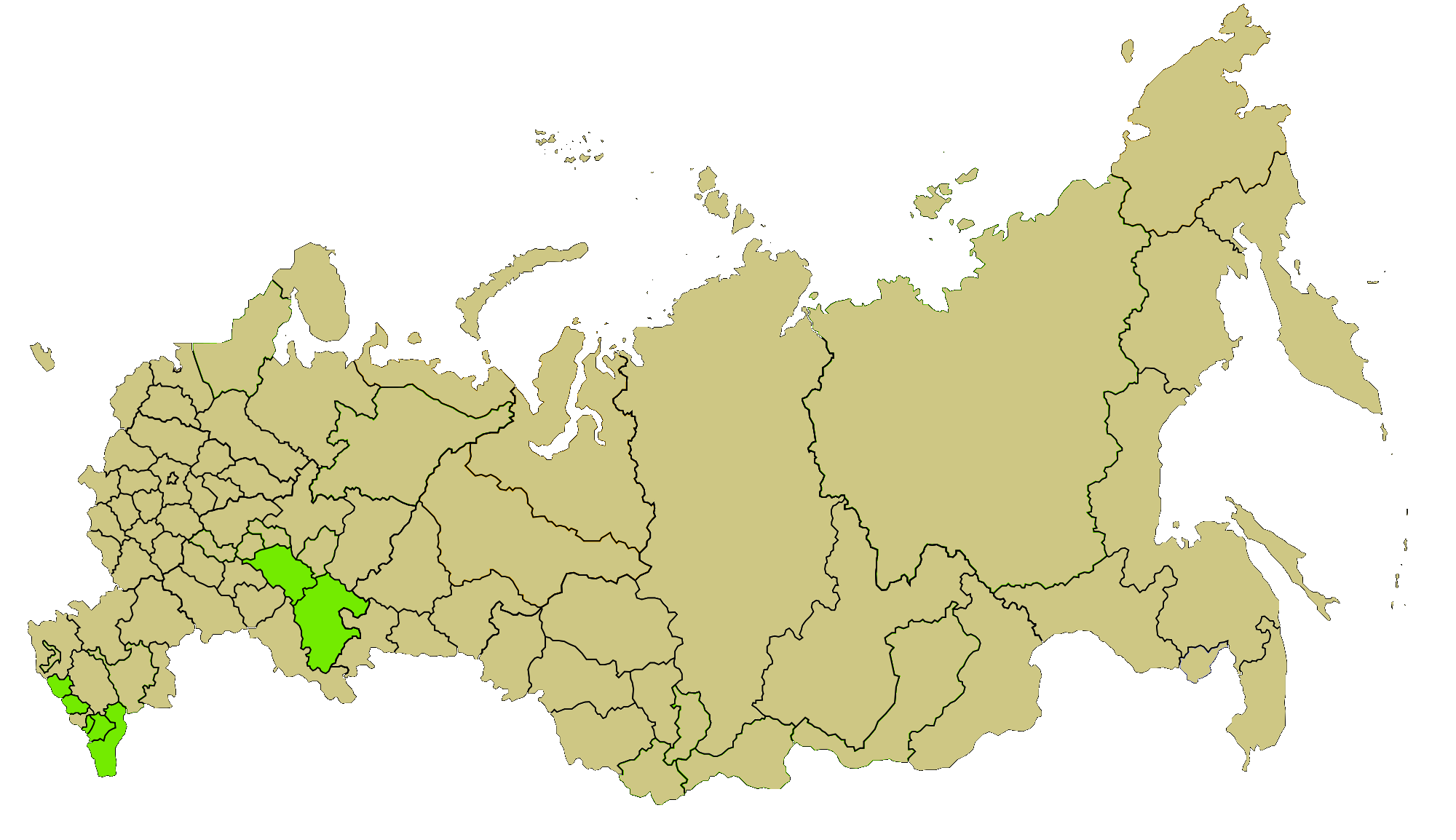
Areas in Russia where Islam is the largest religion. Islam makes up the majority in: Tatarstan, Bashkortostan, Dagestan, Chechnya, Ingushetia, Kabardino-Balkaria, and Karachay-Cherkessia.

There was much evidence of official conciliation toward Islam in Russia in the 1990s. The number of Muslims allowed to make pilgrimages to Mecca increased sharply after the embargo of the Soviet era ended in 1991. In 1995, the newly established Union of Muslims of Russia, led by Imam Khatyb Mukaddas of Tatarstan, began organizing a movement aimed at improving inter-ethnic understanding and ending lingering misconceptions of Islam among non-Muslim Russians. The Union of Muslims of Russia is the direct successor to the pre-World War I Union of Muslims, which had its own faction in the Russian Duma. The post-Communist union formed a political party, the Nur All-Russia Muslim Public Movement, which acts in close coordination with Muslim imams to defend the political, economic, and cultural rights of Muslims. The Islamic Cultural Center of Russia, which includes a madrassa (religious school), opened in Moscow in 1991. In the 1990s, the number of Islamic publications has increased. Among them are few magazines in Russian, namely: "Ислам" (transliteration: Islam), "Эхо Кавказа" (Ekho Kavkaza) and "Исламский вестник" (Islamsky Vestnik), and the Russian-language newspaper "Ассалам" (Assalam), and "Нуруль Ислам" (Nurul Islam), which are published in Makhachkala, Dagestan.

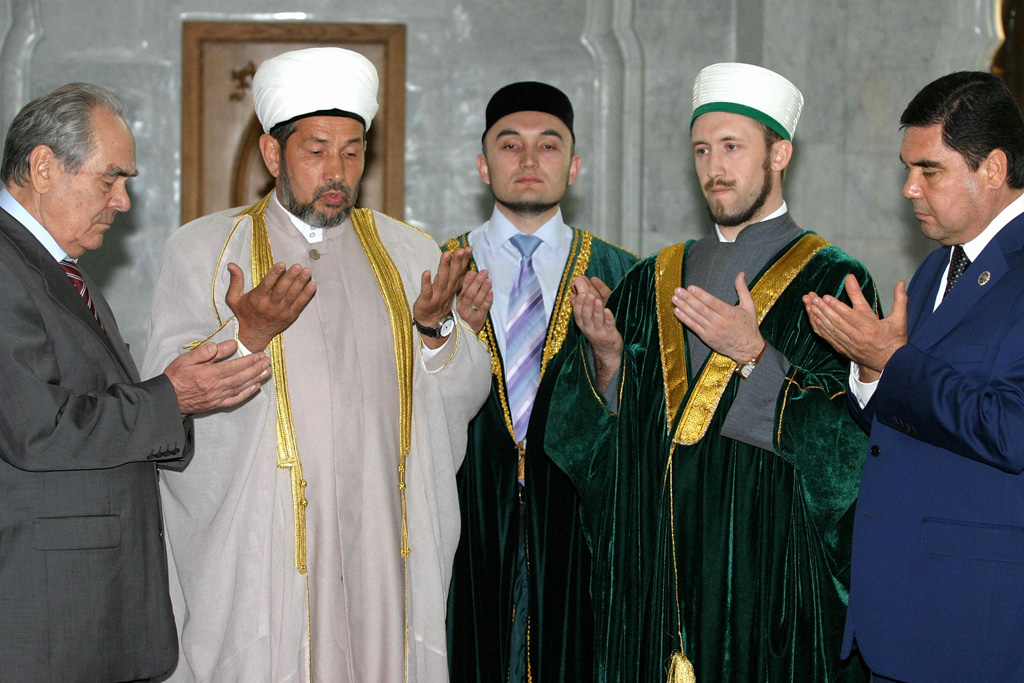
Mintimer Shaimiyev, the president of the republic of Tatarstan, in the Qolşärif Mosque, Kazan

Kazan has a large Muslim population (probably the second after Moscow urban group of the Muslims and the biggest indigenous group in Russia) and is home to the Russian Islamic University in Kazan, Tatarstan. Education is in Russian and Tatar. In Dagestan there are number of Islamic universities and madrassas, notable among them are: Dagestan Islamic University, Institute of Theology and International Relations, whose rector Maksud Sadikov was assassinated on 8 June 2011.

Talgat Tadzhuddin is the Chief Mufti of Russia. Since Soviet times, the Russian government has divided Russia into a number of Muslim Spiritual Directorates. In 1980, Tazhuddin was made Mufti of the European USSR and Siberia Division. Since 1992, he has headed the central or combined Muslim Spiritual Directorate of all of Russia. In 2005, Russia was granted the status of an observer state in the Organisation of Islamic Cooperation Russian president Vladimir Putin has said that Orthodox Christianity is much closer to Islam than Catholicism is. A chain e-mail spread a hoax speech attributed to Putin which called for tough assimilation policies on immigrants, no evidence of any such speech can be found in Russian media or Duma archives.

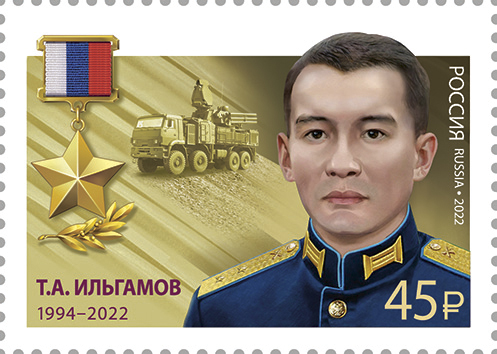
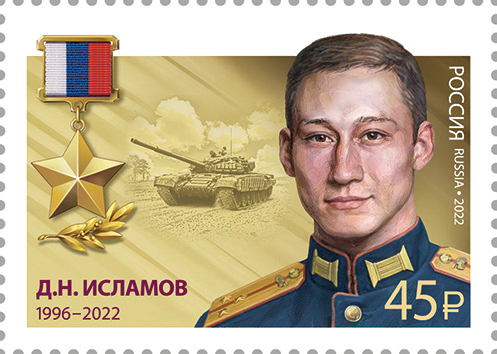
Russian Muslim soldiers killed in the invasion of Ukraine in 2022. The ethnically non-Russian republics of the Russian Federation suffered heavy losses in the war in Ukraine.

Islam has been expanding under Putin's rule. Tatar Muslims are engaging in a revival under Putin. According to The Washington Post, "Russian Muslims are split regarding the [Russian] intervention in Syria, but more are pro- than anti-war." The Grand Mufti of Russia, Talgat Tadzhuddin and other Russia's Muslim leaders supported the Russian invasion of Ukraine. Chechnya's Kadyrovite forces have fought alongside the Russian forces in Ukraine.

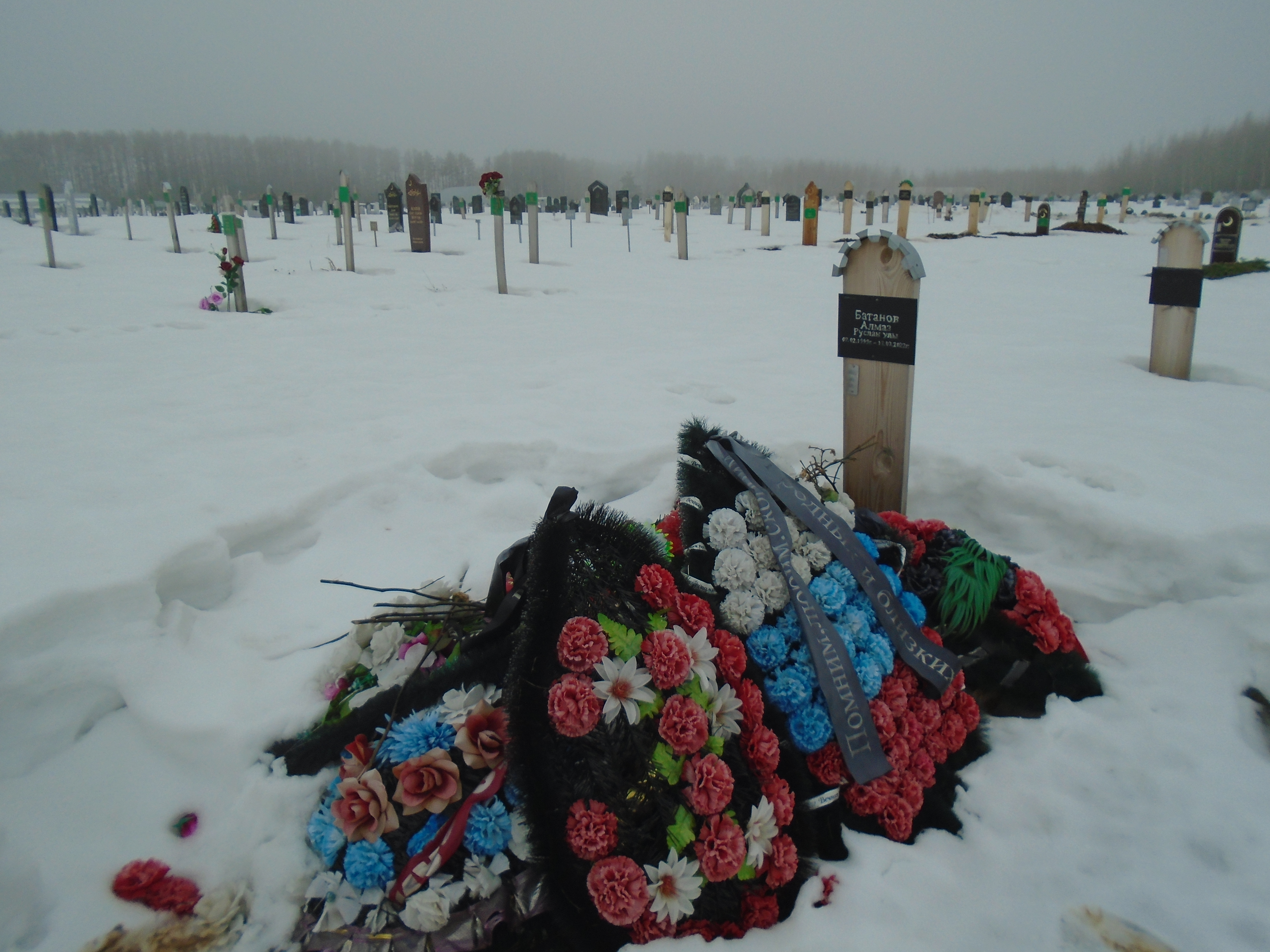
Grave of Russian serviceman Almaz Batanov (1999–2022) at the Samosyrovo Muslim Cemetery in Kazan

After a Quran burning incident that happened in Sweden during Eid al-Adha, Russian president Vladimir Putin defended the Quran by stating that It's a crime in Russia to disrespect the Quran and other holy books.

=== Islam in the North Caucasus ===
In the late 1980s and early 1990s, the Northern Caucasus experienced an Islamic (as well as a national) renaissance. Also radical and extremist streams of Islam started taking root, initially in western (upland) Dagestan.

In 1991, Chechnya declared independence as the Chechen Republic of Ichkeria. Russian Army forces were commanded into Grozny in 1994, but, after two years of intense fighting, the Russian troops eventually withdrew from Chechnya under the Khasavyurt Accord. Chechnya preserved its de facto independence until 1999. However, the Chechen government's grip on Chechnya was weak, especially outside the ruined capital Grozny. The areas controlled by separatist groups grew larger and the country became increasingly lawless. Aslan Maskhadov's government was unable to rebuild the region or to prevent a number of warlords from taking effective control. The relationship between the government and radicals deteriorated. In March 1999, Maskhadov closed down the Chechen parliament and introduced aspects of Sharia. Despite this concession, extremists such as Shamil Basayev and the Saudi-born Islamist Ibn Al-Khattab continued to undermine the Maskhadov government. In April 1998, the group publicly declared that its long-term aim was the creation of a union of Chechnya and Dagestan under Islamic rule and the expulsion of Russians from the entire Caucasian Region. This eventually led to the invasion of militants in Dagestan and the start of the Second Chechen War in 1999. The Chechen separatists were internally divided between the Islamic extremists, the more moderate pro-independent Muslim Chechens and the traditional Islamic authorities with various positions towards Chechen independence. An interim Russian-controlled administration was imposed in Chechnya in 2000, headed by the ex-Mufti and, therefore, religious leader of Sufism, Akhmad Kadyrov. Encouraged by the Russian strategy of using the traditional Islamic structures and leaders against the Islamic extremists, there was a process of religious radicalisation in Chechnya and other Northern Caucasus regions.

At the end of the Second Chechen War, in 2005, Chechen rebel leader, Abdul-Halim Sadulayev, decreed the formation of a Caucasus Front against Russia, among Islamic believers in the North Caucasus, in an attempt to widen Chechnya's conflict with Russia. After his death, his successor, Dokka Umarov, declared continuing jihad to establish an Islamic fundamentalist Caucasus Emirate in the North Caucasus and beyond. Insurgency in the North Caucasus continued until 2017. The police and the FSB carried out mass arrests and used harsh interrogation techniques. Some of those who closely followed the teachings of Islam have lost their jobs; mosques have also been closed.

Russian president Vladimir Putin has allowed the de facto implementation of Sharia law in Chechnya by Ramzan Kadyrov, including polygamy and enforced veiling.

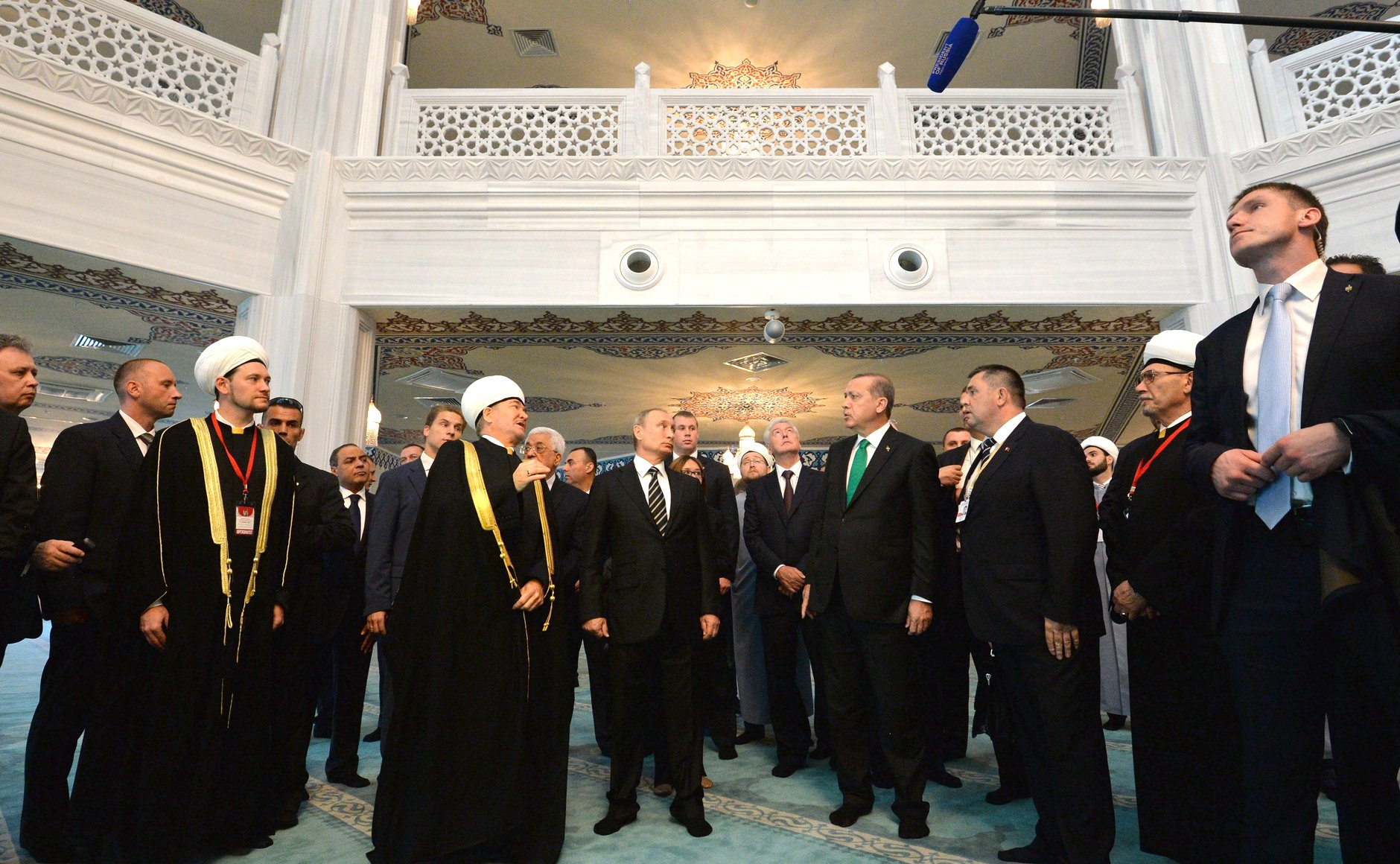
Vladimir Putin and Recep Tayyip Erdoğan opened Moscow's Cathedral Mosque on 23 September 2015.

There was anger from Muslims from the Caucasus against the Charlie Hebdo cartoons in France. Putin is believed to have backed protests by Muslims in Russia against Charlie Hebdo cartoons and the West.

=== Demographics and branches ===
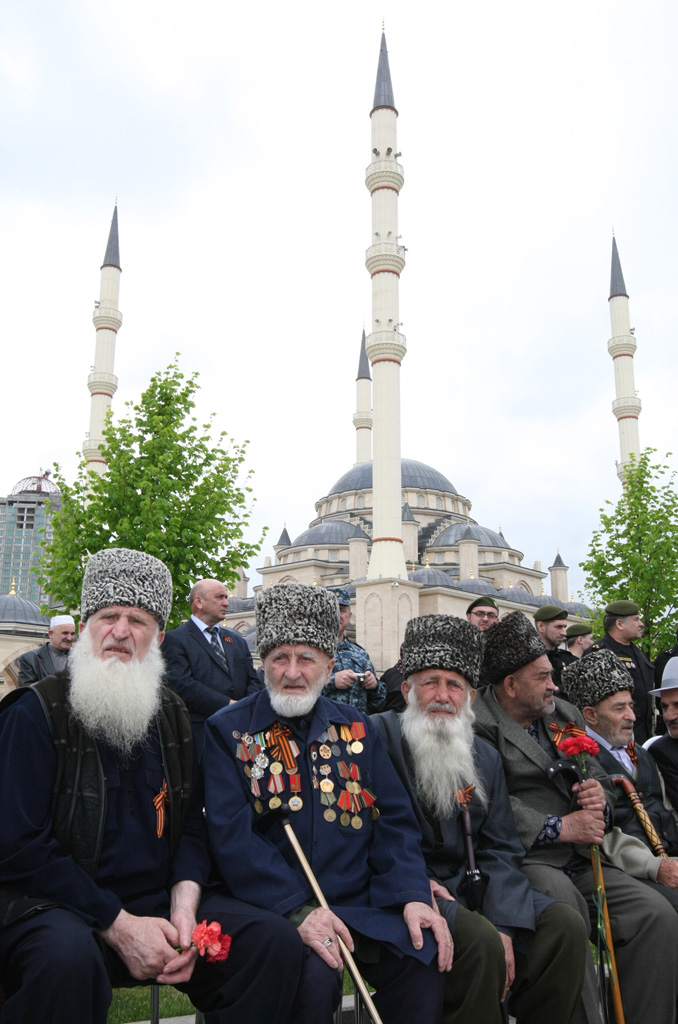
Chechen World War II veterans during celebrations on the 66th anniversary of victory in the Second World War

More than 90% of Muslims in Russia adhere to Sunni Islam of the Hanafi and Shafi'i schools. In a few areas, notably Dagestan, Chechnya and Ingushetia, there is a tradition of Sunni Sufism, which is represented by Qadiriyya, Naqshbandi and Shadhili orders. Naqshbandi–Shadhili spiritual master Said Afandi al-Chirkawi received hundreds of visitors daily.

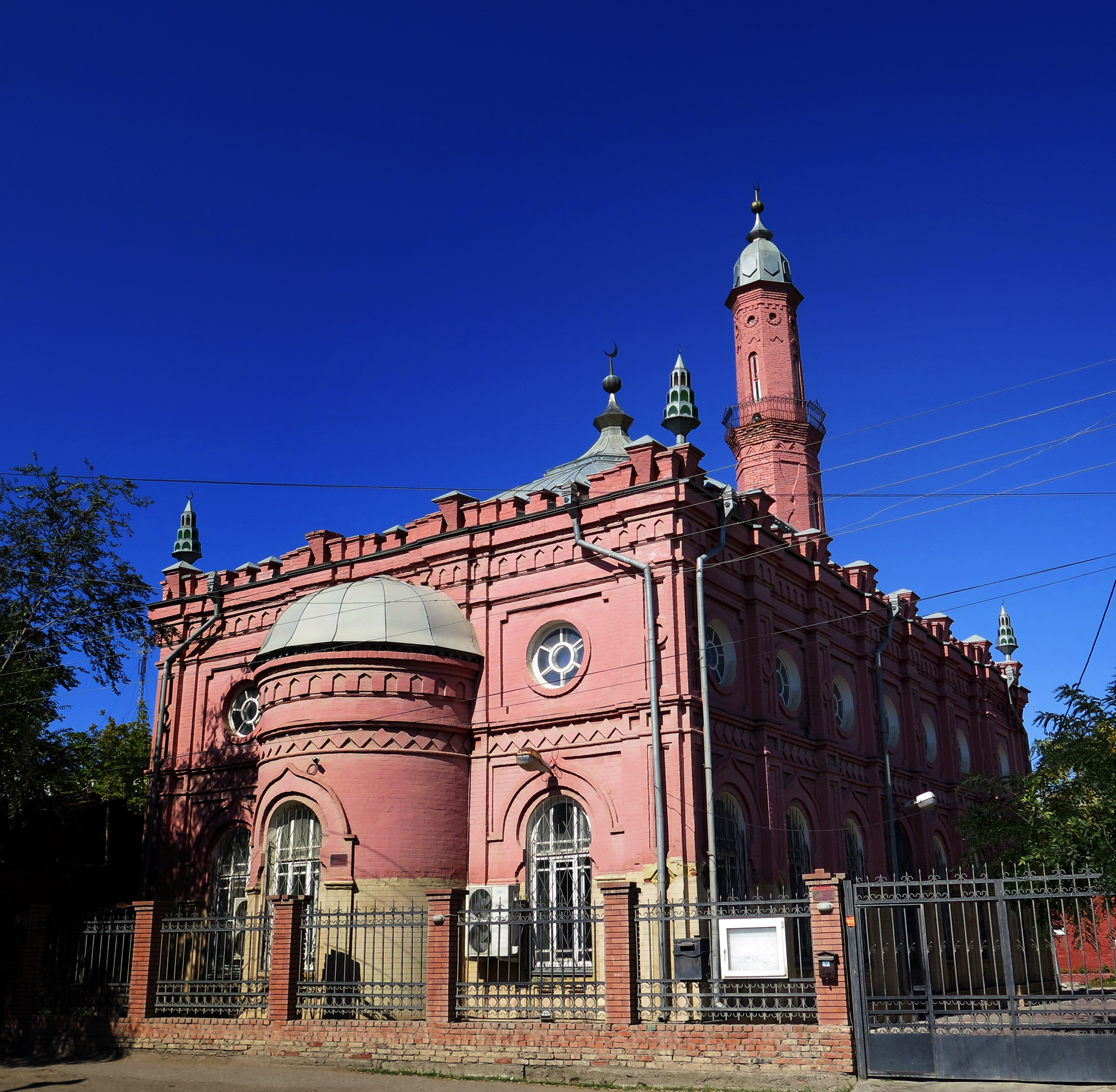
Baku Mosque in Astrakhan, former Sunni, presently belonging to the Twelver Shia community

About 10%, or more than two million, are Shia Muslims, mostly of Twelver Shi'ism branch. At first, they are the Azeris, who historically and still are today, followers of Shi'a Islam, as their republic split off from the Soviet Union, significant number of Azeris immigrated to Russia in search of work. In addition to them, some of the indigenous peoples of Dagestan, such as the Lezgins (a minority) and the Tats (a majority), are Shias too. Nizari Isma'ili Muslims—another Shia branch—are represented only by the Pamiris, migrants from Tajikistan. There is also an active presence of Ahmadis and Non-denominational muslims.

In 2021, Putin announced that some 20% of Russian aviation industry employees are Muslims.

In 2025, the Russian Public Opinion Research Center (VCIOM) claimed that 7% of Russians identified as Muslims

=== Conversions of ethnic Russians ===
Most Muslims in Russia belong to ethnic minorities but in the recent years there have been conversions among the Russian majority as well, one of the country's main Islamic institutions, the Moscow-based Spiritual Administration of Muslims of the Russian Federation (DUM RF) estimating the ethnic Russian converts to number into the "tens of thousands" while some converts themselves give numbers between 50,000 and 70,000.

In 2004, several factions of self-identified Russian Muslims founded the National Organization of Russian Muslims (NORM), explicitly limiting membership to ethnic Russians. As of 2017, Vadim Sydorov, a leader of the NORM who took the Arabic name Harun ar-Rusi following his conversion, claimed that the organization represented 150,000 newly converted Muslims of ethnic Russian background. The NORM's spiritual leader was Geydar Dzhemal, a controversial Islamic intellectual and political activist. Some researchers identify within this milieu a distinct ideological movement known as Aryan Islam. Its adherents characterise Islam as a "path to the rebirth of the Russian nation" and, in more radical formulations, a means to the "revival of the white race". This interpretation is set out in the Declaration on the Formation of the Russian Muslim Movement, which proclaims Russian Muslims to be the "vanguard bastion of the Aryan race".

=== Hajj ===
A record 18,000 Russian Muslim pilgrims from all over the country attended the Hajj in Mecca, Saudi Arabia in 2006. Due to overwhelming demand from Russian Muslims, on 5 July 2011, Muftis requested President Dmitry Medvedev's assistance in increasing the allocated by Saudi Arabia pilgrimage quota in Vladikavkaz. The III International Conference on Hajj Management attended by some 170 delegates from 12 counties was held in Kazan from 7 – 9 July 2011.

=== Language controversies ===
For centuries, the Tatars constituted the only Muslim ethnic group in European Russia, with Tatar language being the only language used in their mosques, a situation which saw rapid change over the course of the 20th century as a large number of Caucasian and Central Asian Muslims migrated to central Russian cities and began attending Tatar-speaking mosques, generating pressure on the imams of such mosques to begin using Russian.

=== Public perception of Muslims ===
A survey published in 2019 by the Pew Research Center found that 76% of Russians had a favourable view of Muslims in their country, whereas 19% had an unfavourable view.

== Islam in Russia by region ==
Percentage of Muslims in Russia by region
Region	Percentage of Muslims	Source
Adygea	24.60	Source
Altai Krai	1.00	Source
Altai Republic	6.20	Source
Amur Oblast	0.63	Source
Arkhangelsk Oblast	0.00	Source
Astrakhan Oblast	14.62	Source
Bashkortostan	54.3	Source
Belgorod Oblast	0.62	Source
Bryansk Oblast	0.25	Source
Buryatia	0.20	Source
Chechnya	95.00	Source
Chelyabinsk Oblast	6.87	Source
Chukotka	0.00	Source
Chuvashia	3.50	Source
Crimea	15.00	Source
Dagestan	83.00	Source
Ingushetia	96.00	Source
Irkutsk Oblast	1.25	Source
Ivanovo Oblast	0.50	Source
Jewish Autonomous Oblast	0.80	Source
Kabardino-Balkaria	70.40	Source
Kaliningrad Oblast	0.25	Source
Kalmykia	4.80	Source
Kaluga Oblast	0.63	Source
Kamchatka Krai	1.20	Source
Karachay-Cherkessia	64.20	Source
Karelia	0.20	Source
Kemerovo Oblast	1.00	Source
Khabarovsk Krai	1.13	Source
Khakassia	0.60	Source
Khanty-Mansi Autonomous Okrug	10.88	Source
Kirov Oblast	0.87	Source
Komi Republic	1.00	Source
Kostroma Oblast	0.60	Source
Krasnodar Krai	1.37	Source
Krasnoyarsk Krai	1.50	Source
Kurgan Oblast	2.62	Source
Kursk Oblast	0.25	Source
Leningrad Oblast	0.75	Source
Lipetsk Oblast	1.13	Source
Magadan Oblast	1.00	Source
Mari El	6.00	Source
Mordovia	2.50	Source
Moscow	3.50	Source
Moscow Oblast	2.12	Source
Murmansk Oblast	1.00	Source
Nenets Autonomous Okrug	0.00	Source
Nizhny Novgorod Oblast	0.13	Source
North Ossetia-Alania	4.00	Source
Novgorod Oblast	0.80	Source
Novosibirsk Oblast	1.13	Source
Omsk Oblast	2.75	Source
Orenburg Oblast	13.87	Source
Oryol Oblast	0.25	Source
Penza Oblast	5.75	Source
Perm Krai	4.00	Source
Primorsky Krai	0.50	Source
Pskov Oblast	0.20	Source
Rostov Oblast	1.13	Source
Ryazan Oblast	1.00	Source
Saint Petersburg	2.25	Source
Sakhalin Oblast	0.40	Source
Samara Oblast	2.25	Source
Saratov Oblast	2.40	Source
Sevastopol	0.00	Source
Smolensk Oblast	0.12	Source
Stavropol Krai	2.00	Source
Sverdlovsk Oblast	2.88	Source
Tambov Oblast	0.25	Source
Tatarstan	53.80	Source
Tomsk Oblast	1.13	Source
Tula Oblast	1.00	Source
Tuva	0.00	Source
Tver Oblast	0.75	Source
Tyumen Oblast	5.75	Source
Udmurtia	4.25	Source
Ulyanovsk Oblast	6.87	Source
Vladimir Oblast	0.63	Source
Volgograd Oblast	3.50	Source
Vologda Oblast	0.25	Source
Voronezh Oblast	0.38	Source
Yakutia	1.40	Source
Yamalo-Nenets Autonomous Okrug	17.40	Source
Yaroslavl Oblast	0.75	Source
Zabaykalsky Krai	0.25	Source

=== Islam in Moscow ===
According to the 2010 Russian census, Moscow has less than 300,000 permanent residents of Muslim background, while some estimates suggest that Moscow has around 1 million Muslim residents and up to 1.5 million more Muslim migrant workers. The city has permitted the existence of four mosques. The mayor of Moscow claims that four mosques are sufficient for the population. The city's economy "could not manage without them," he said. There are currently four mosques in Moscow, and 8,000 in the whole of Russia. Muslim migrants from Central Asia have had an impact on the culture with Samsa becoming one of the most popular take away foods in the city.

== List of Russian muftiates ==
All-Russia boards
Grand Muftiates	Grand Muftis	Term of office	Headquarters
The Central Spiritual Administration of the Muslims of Russia	Sheikh-ul-Islam Talgat Tadzhuddin	1992–present	Ufa
The Spiritual Administration of the Muslims of Russian Federation	Sheikh Rawil Ğaynetdin	2014–present	Moscow
Muftiate	Mufti	Term of office	Headquarters
The Spiritual Assembly of the Muslims of Russia	Albir Krganov	2016–present	Moscow

Interregional boards
Muftiates	Muftis	Term of office	Headquarters
The Coordinating Center of North Caucasus Muslims	Ismail Berdiyev	2003–2024	Moscow and Buynaksk
The Spiritual Administration of the Muslims of the Asian Part of Russia	Nafigulla Ashirov	1997–present	Moscow and Tobolsk

Notable regional muftiates
Muftiates	Muftis	Term of office	Headquarters
The Muftiate of the Republic of Dagestan	Sheikh Ahmad Afandi Abdulaev	1998–present	Makhachkala
The Spiritual Administration of the Muslims of the Republic of Adygea and Krasnodar Krai	Askarbiy Kardanov	2012–present	Maykop
The Spiritual Administration of the Muslims of the Republic of Bashkortostan	Ainur Birgalin	2019–present	Ufa
The Spiritual Administration of the Muslims of the Chechen Republic	Salah Mezhiev	2014–present	Grozny
The Spiritual Administration of the Muslims of the Kabardino-Balkaria	Hazrataliy Dzasejev	2010–present	Nalchik
The Spiritual Administration of the Muslims of the Karachay-Cherkess Republic	Ismail Berdiyev	1991–present	Cherkessk
The Spiritual Administration of the Muslims of the Republic of North Ossetia–Alania	Khajimurat Gatsalov	2011–present	Vladikavkaz
The Spiritual Administration of Muslims of the Republic of Tatarstan	Kamil Samigullin	2013–present	Kazan
The Spiritual Centre of the Muslims of the Republic of Ingushetia	Isa Khamkhoev	2004–present	Magas
The Spiritual Administration of Muslims of the Chuvash Republic	Albir Krganov	1994–present	Shygyrdan
The Spiritual Administration of Muslims of the Republic of Karelia			
The Spiritual Administration of Muslims of Nizhny Novgorod Oblast			

== Notable Russian Muslims ==
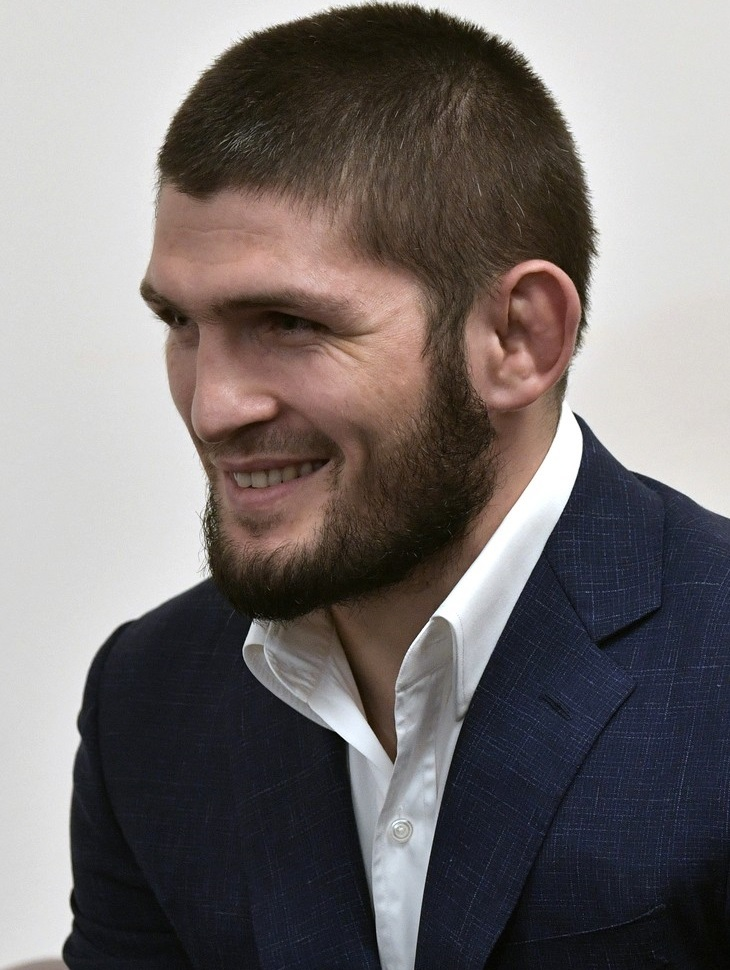
Khabib Nurmagomedov

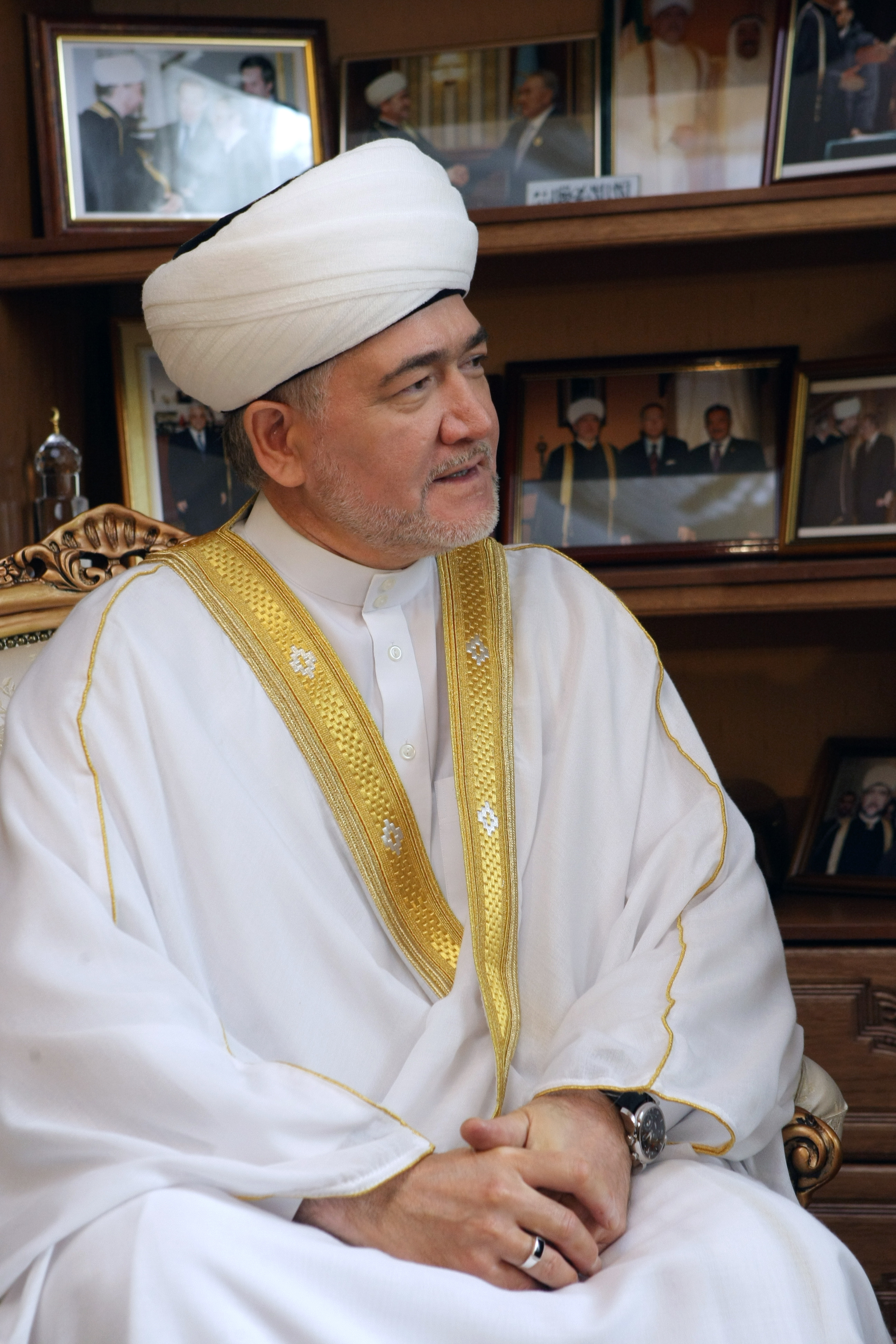
Rawil Ğaynetdin

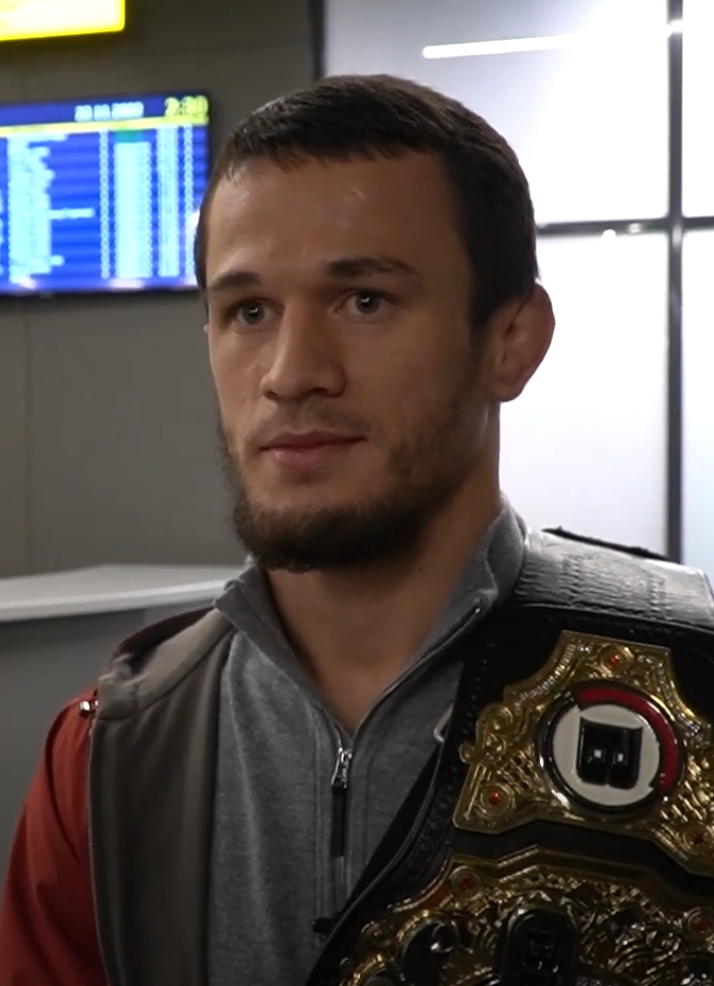
Usman Nurmagomedov

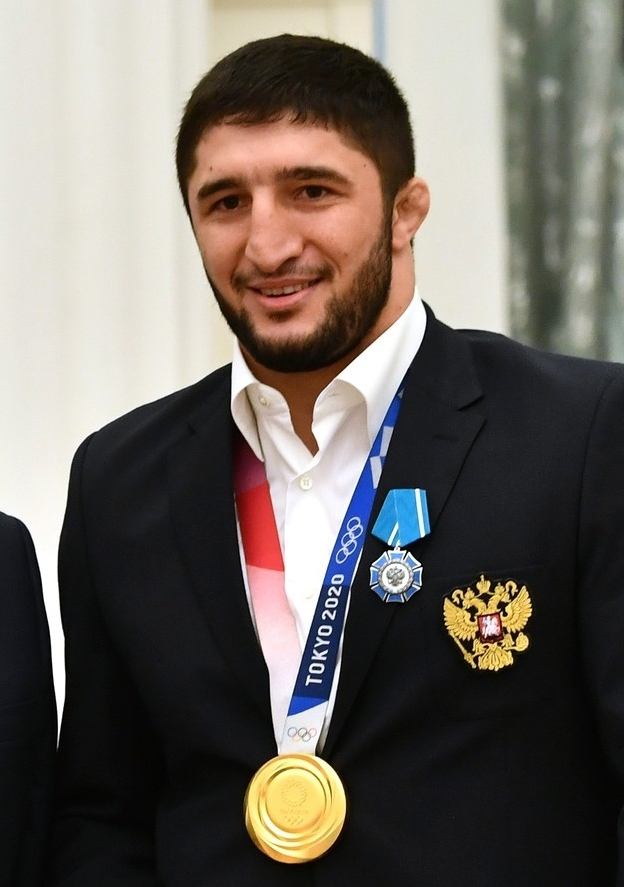
Abdulrashid Sadulaev

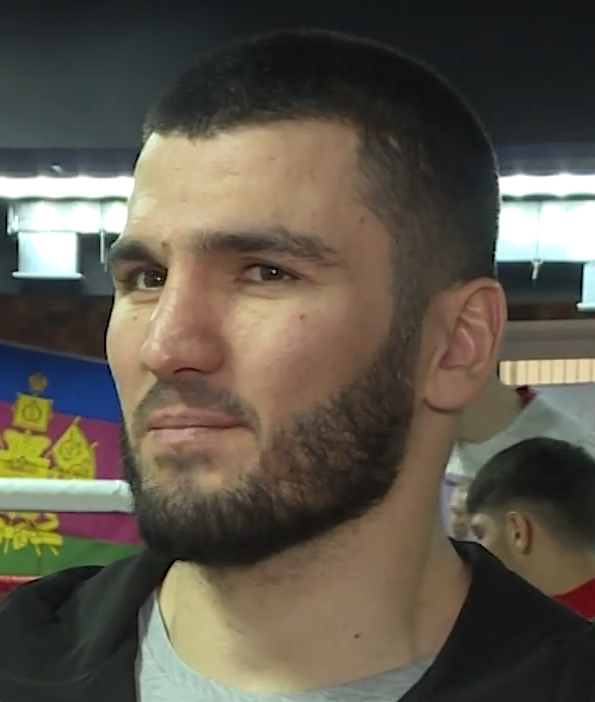
Artur Beterbiev

Ramazan Ramazanov

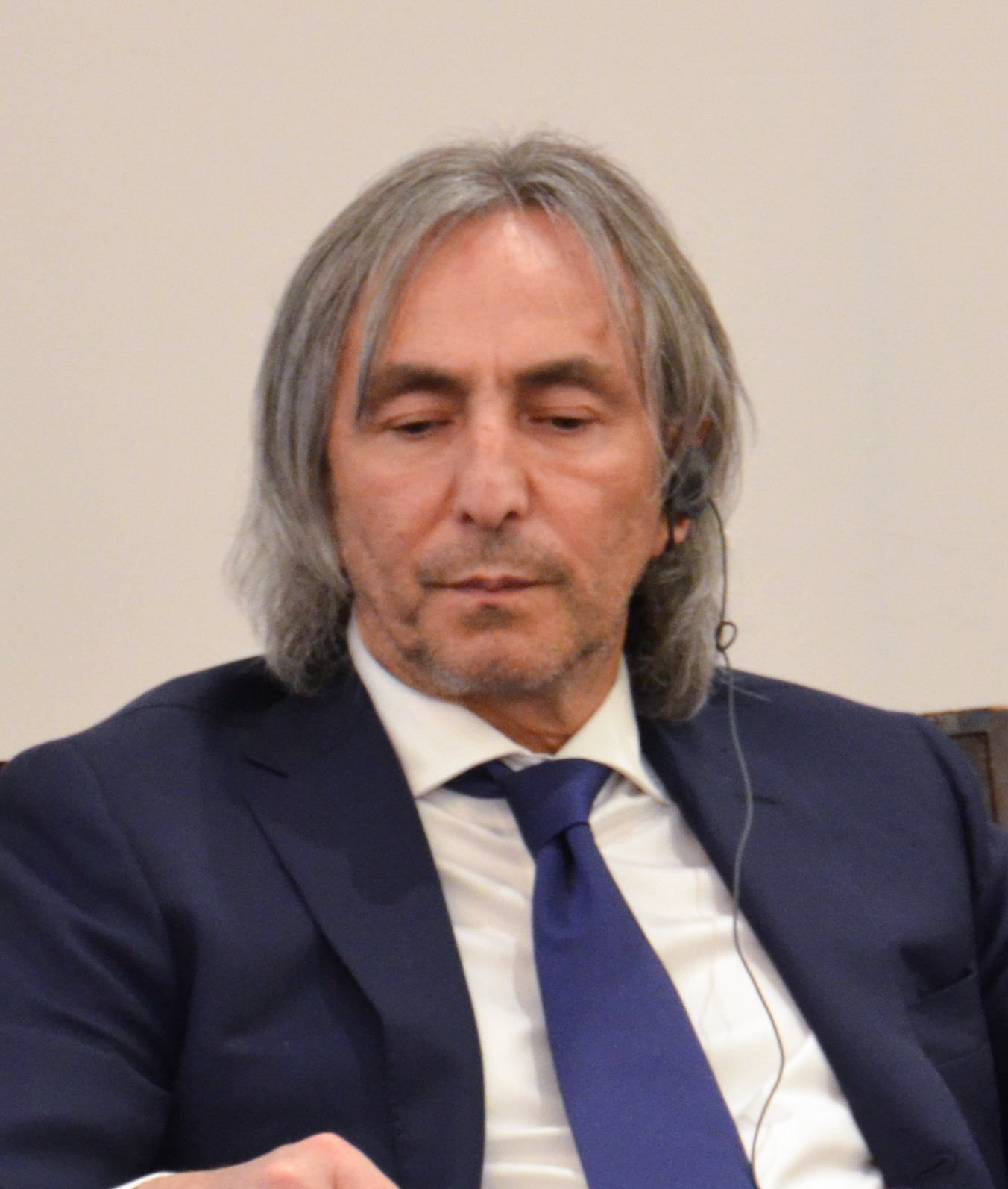
Umar Dzhabrailov

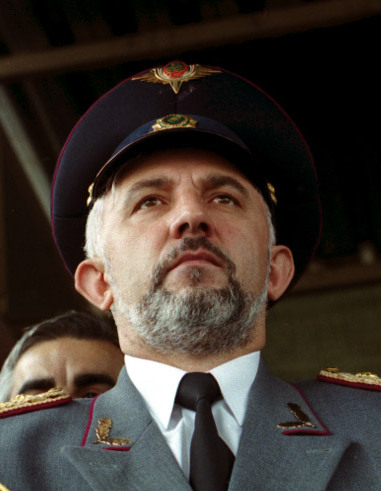
Aslan Maskhadov

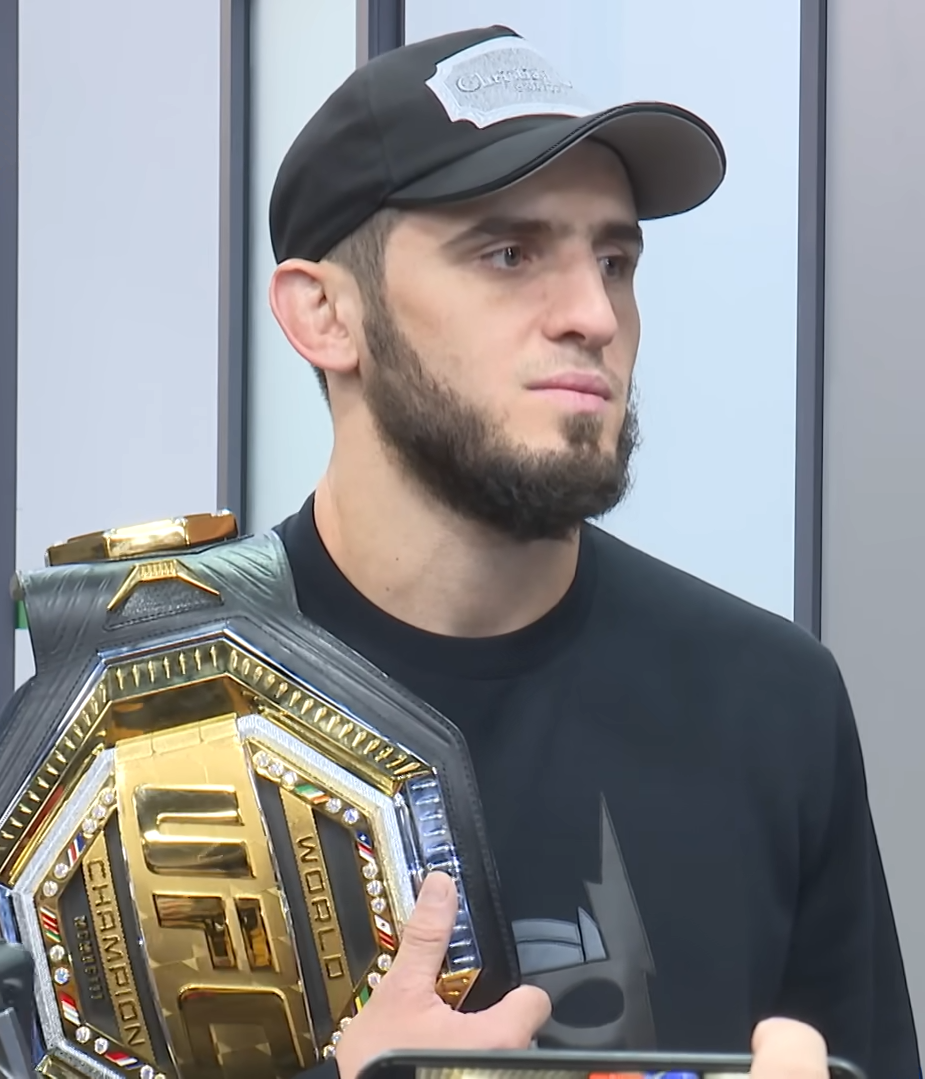
Islam Makhachev

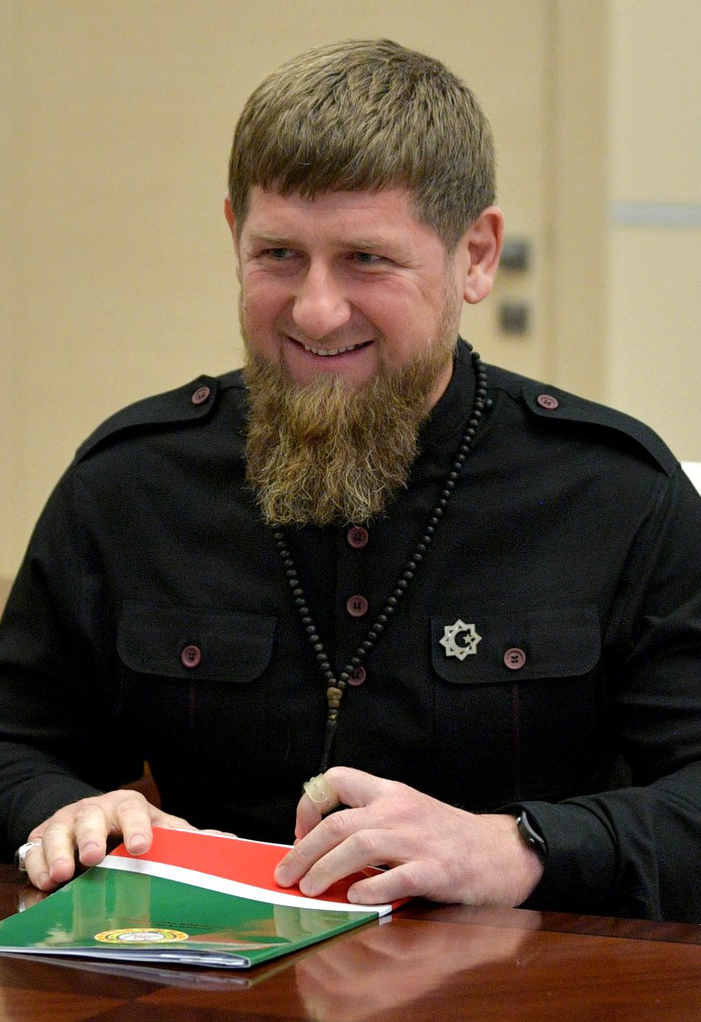
Ramzan Kadyrov

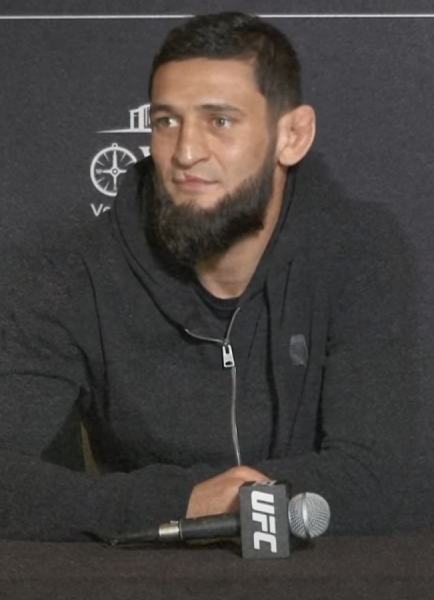
Khamzat Chimaev

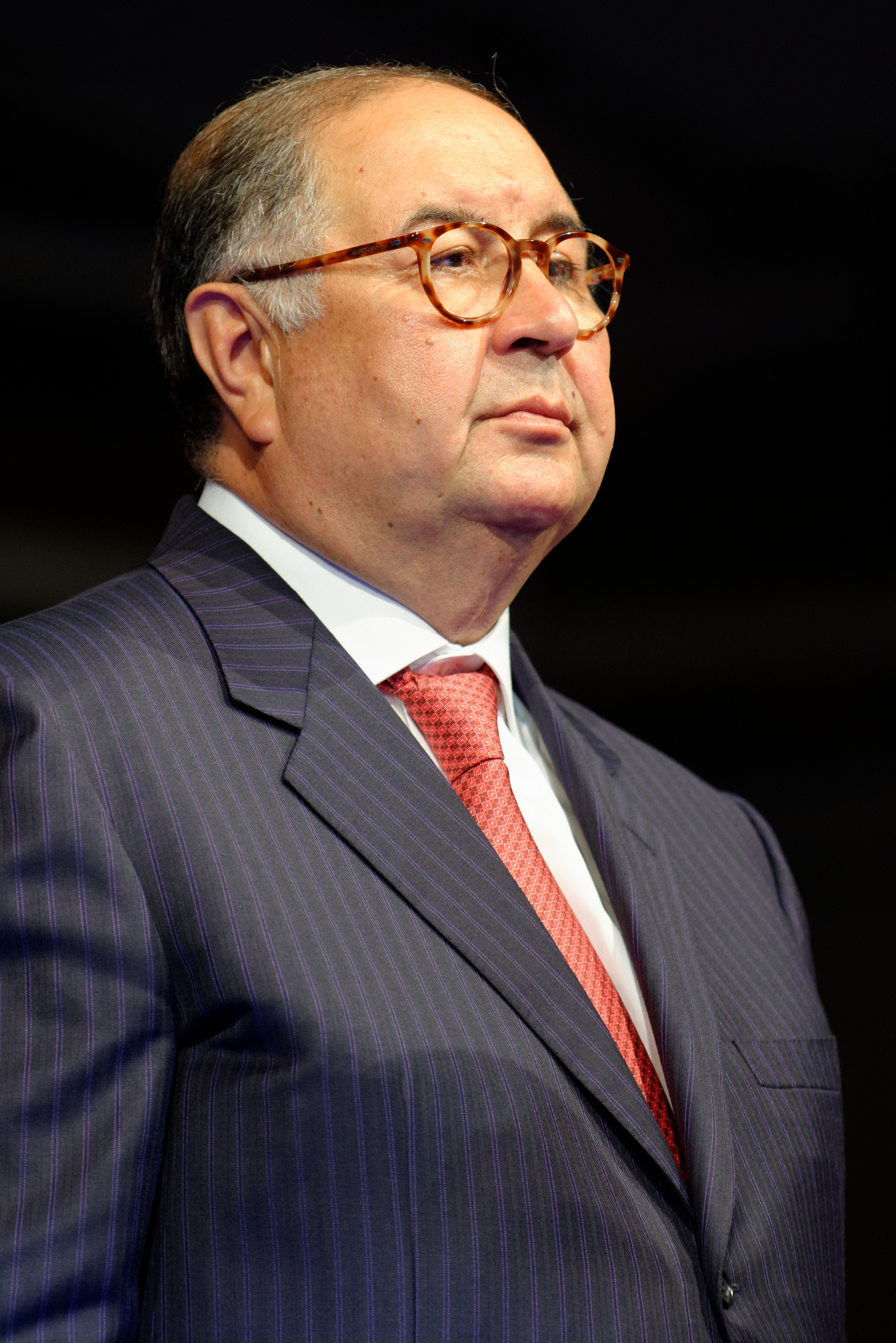
Alisher Usmanov

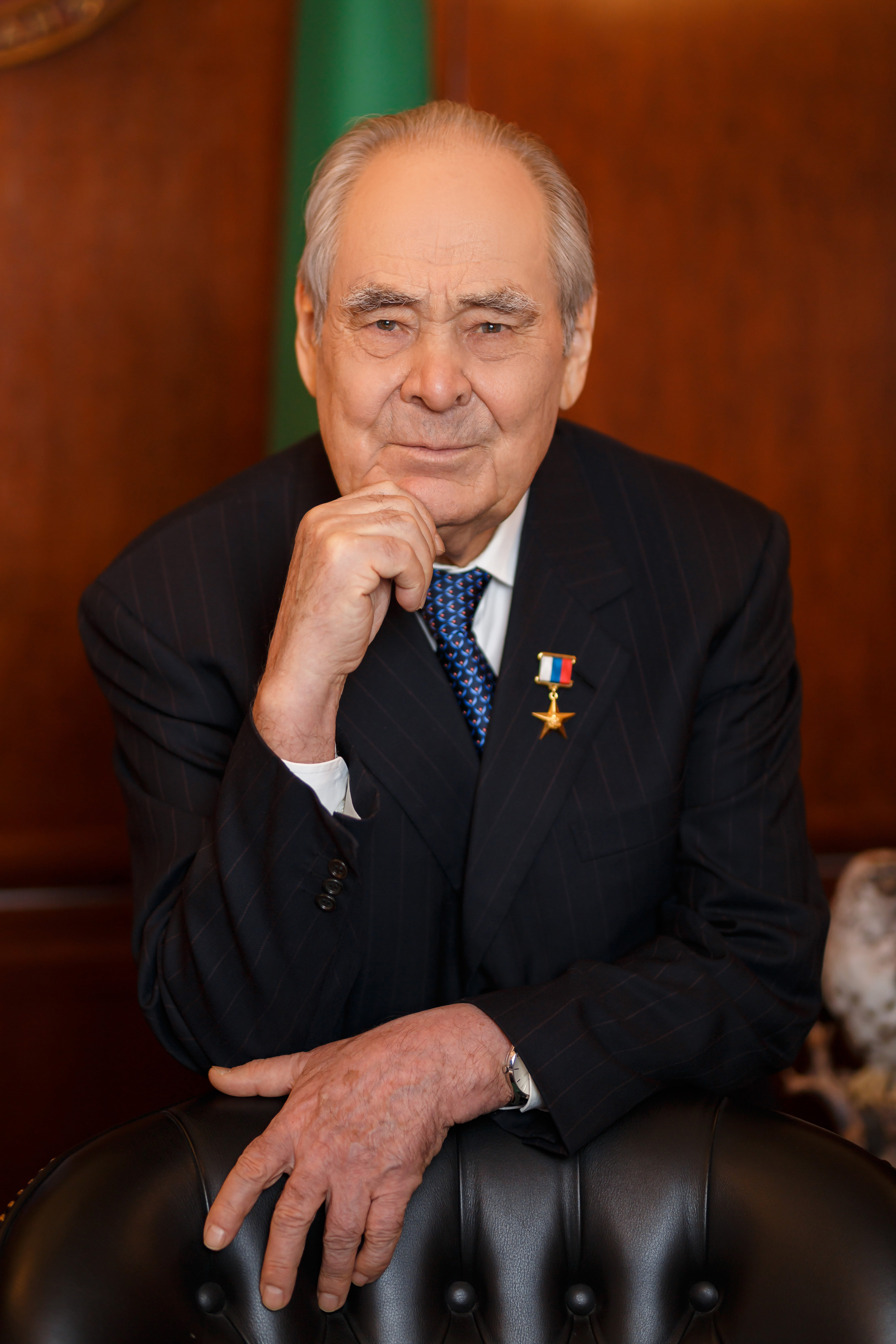
Mintimer Shaimiev

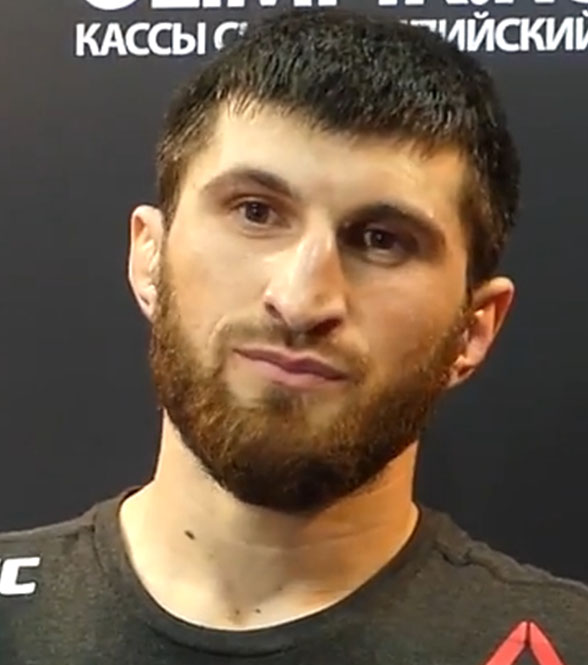
Magomed Ankalaev

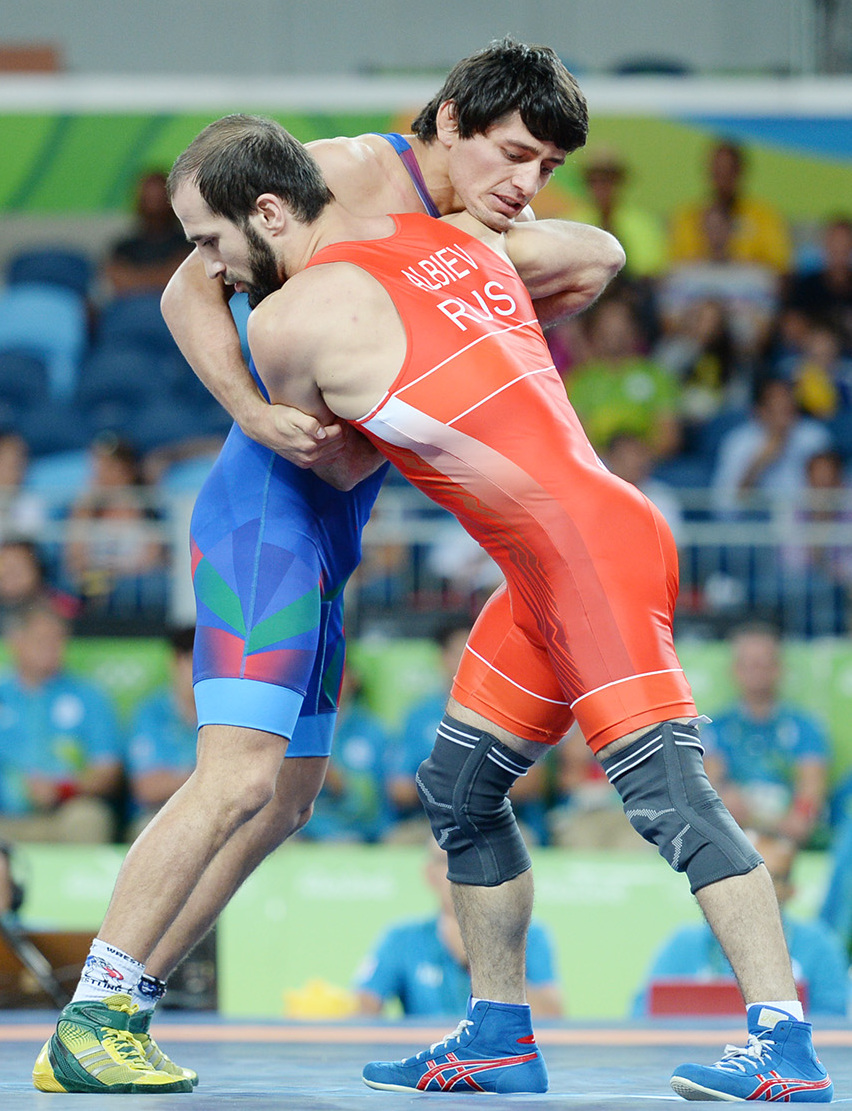
Islambek Albiev

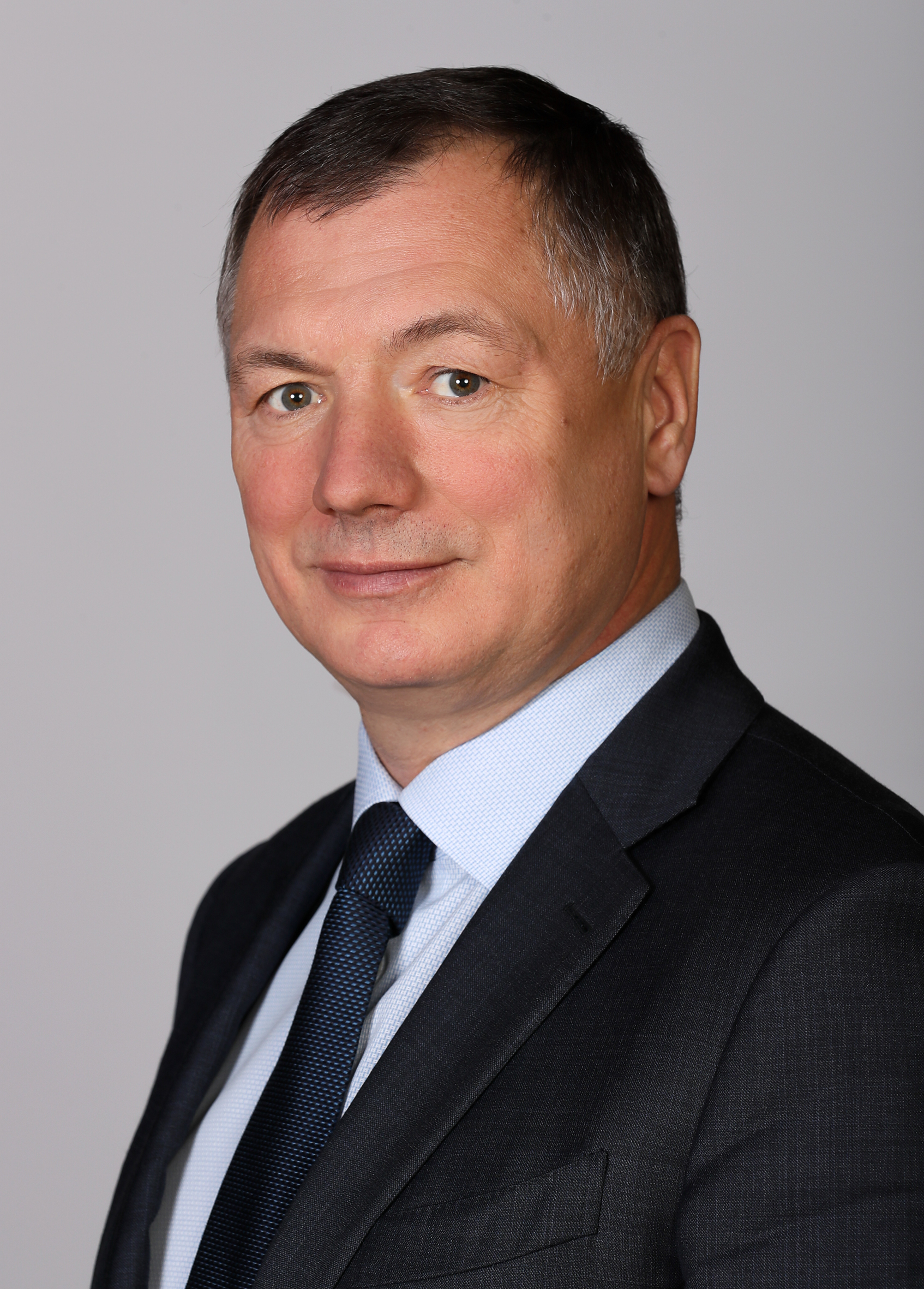
Marat Khusnullin

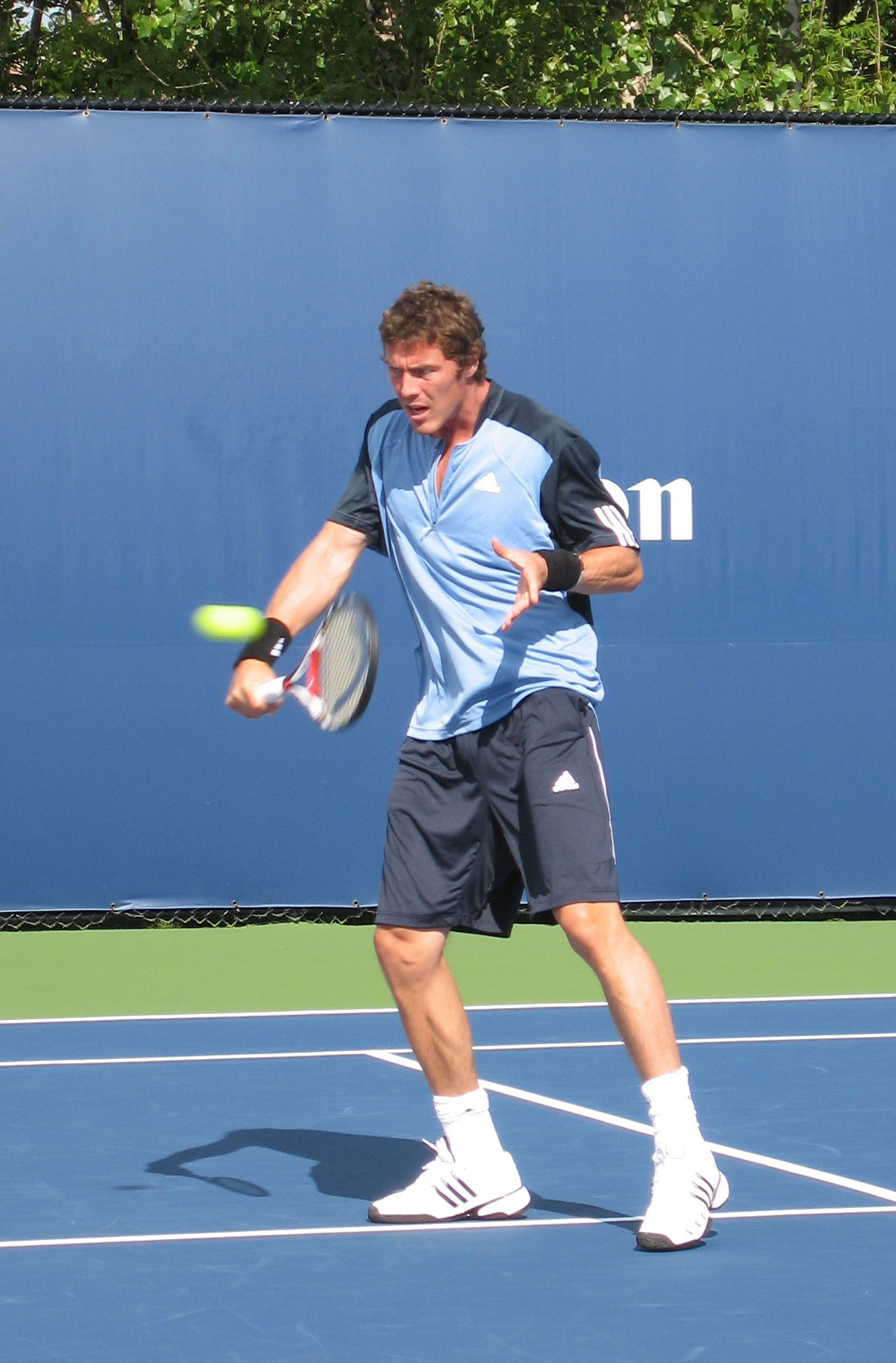
Marat Safin

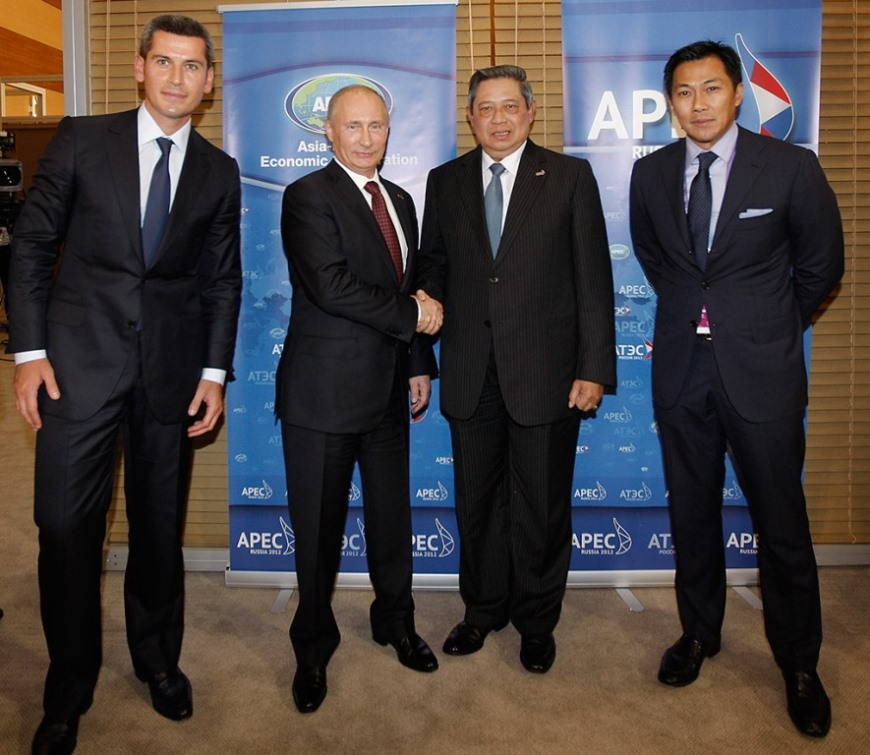
Ziyavudin Magomedov

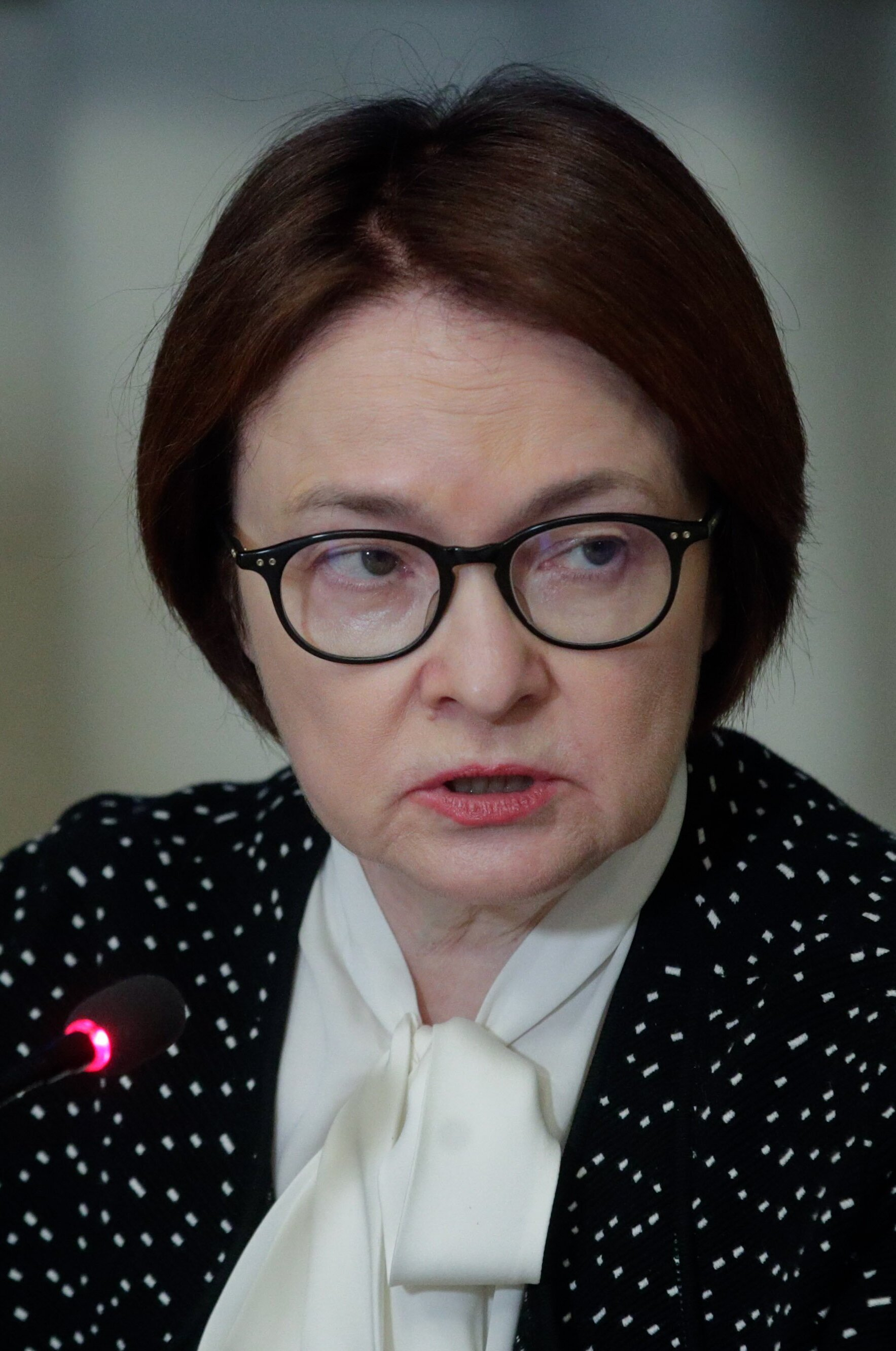
Elvira Nabiullina

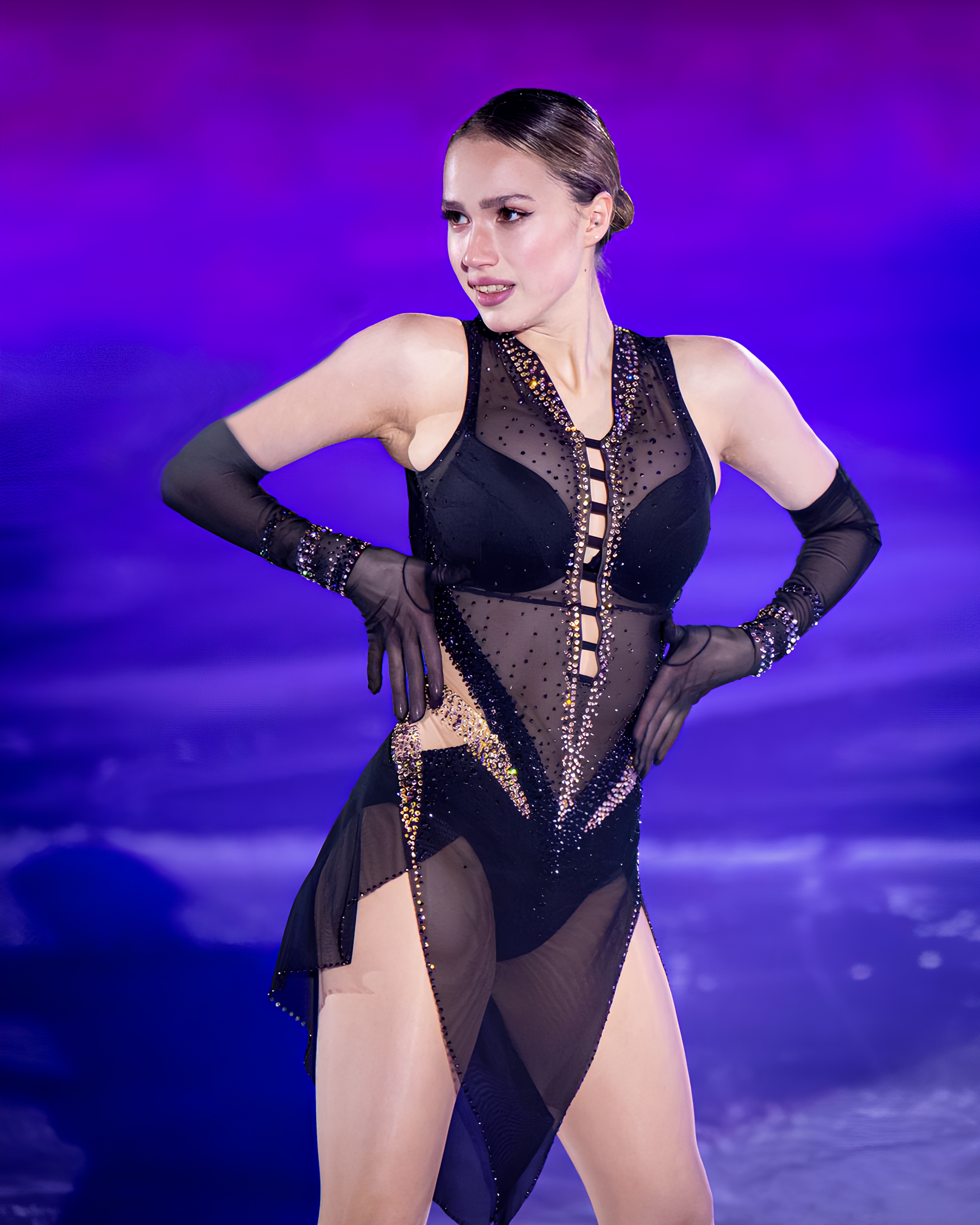
Alina Zagitova

- Abdulkadir Abdullayev (b. 1988), professional boxer, winner of gold medal at the European Games and bronze at the world championships
- Islambek Albiev, gold medalist wrestler at the 2008 Summer Olympics in Greco-Roman wrestling
- Gasret Aliev (1922–1981), World War II soldier, awarded Hero of Soviet Union medal
- Ikram Aliskerov, professional mixed martial artist
- Magomed Ankalaev, professional mixed martial artist and former UFC Light heavyweight champion
- Ruslan Baisarov, entrepreneur and businessman
- Musa Bazhaev, president of Alliance Group
- Ziya Bazhayev (1960–2000), founder of Alliance group and philanthropist
- Khamzat Chimaev, professional UFC middleweight fighter
- Umar Dzhabrailov, businessman and politician
- Movsar Evloev, mixed martial artist
- Musa Evloev, Greco-Roman wrestler and Olympic gold medalist
- Magomet Gadzhiyev (1907–1942), World War II submarine commander and Hero of the Soviet Union
- Nassourdine Imavov, professional UFC middleweight fighter
- Abdulkhakim Ismailov, (1916–2010), World War II soldier; was photographed by Yevgeny Khaldei raising the flag of the Soviet Union over the Reichstag in Berlin on 2 May 1945, days before Nazi Germany's surrender
- Akhmad Kadyrov, first president of the Chechen republic
- Movlid Khaybulaev, professional mixed martial artist
- Hasbulla Magomedov, comedian, entertainer and internet personality
- Ziyavudin Magomedov, Russian billionaire and oligarch
- Zabit Magomedsharipov, former professional mixed martial artist
- Islam Makhachev, professional mixed martial artist and current UFC undisputed lightweight champion
- Shamil Musaev, freestyle wrestler
- Elvira Nabiullina, head of Russia's central bank
- Rudolf Nureyev, considered the greatest male ballet dancer of his generation
- Abdulmanap Nurmagomedov, Soviet military veteran, former judoka and combat sports coach, and the father of former UFC Undisputed Lightweight Champion Khabib Nurmagomedov
- Abubakar Nurmagomedov, professional mixed martial artist
- Khabib Nurmagomedov, professional mixed martial artist and first Russian UFC champion
- Umar Nurmagomedov, a professional mixed martial artist
- Usman Nurmagomedov, professional mixed martial artist and current Bellator MMA undisputed lightweight champion
- Vyacheslav Polosin, former Russian Orthodox Church priest who was at the forefront of a campaign to make Orthodox Christmas a public holiday in Russia and converted to Islam in 1999
- Gadzhi Rabadanov, professional mixed martial artist
- Ramazan Ramazanov, professional kickboxer with seven world Muay Thai world championship wins
- Abdulrashid Sadulaev, widely regarded as one of the most dominant active freestyle wrestlers in the world as well as one of the greatest freestyle wrestlers of all time
- Marat Safin, former world No. 1 tennis player
- Malik Saidullaev, businessman and politician
- Imam Shamil, political leader and Imam of Dagestan, who resisted against Russian expansion of the Caucasus
- Vladislav Surkov, businessman and politician, former advisor to the president of Russia
- Zubaira Tukhugov, professional mixed martial artist
- Tagir Ulanbekov, professional mixed martial artist
- Alisher Usmanov, Russian oligarch worth est. $16.7 billion in March 2025
- Alina Zagitova, figure skater

== Gallery ==
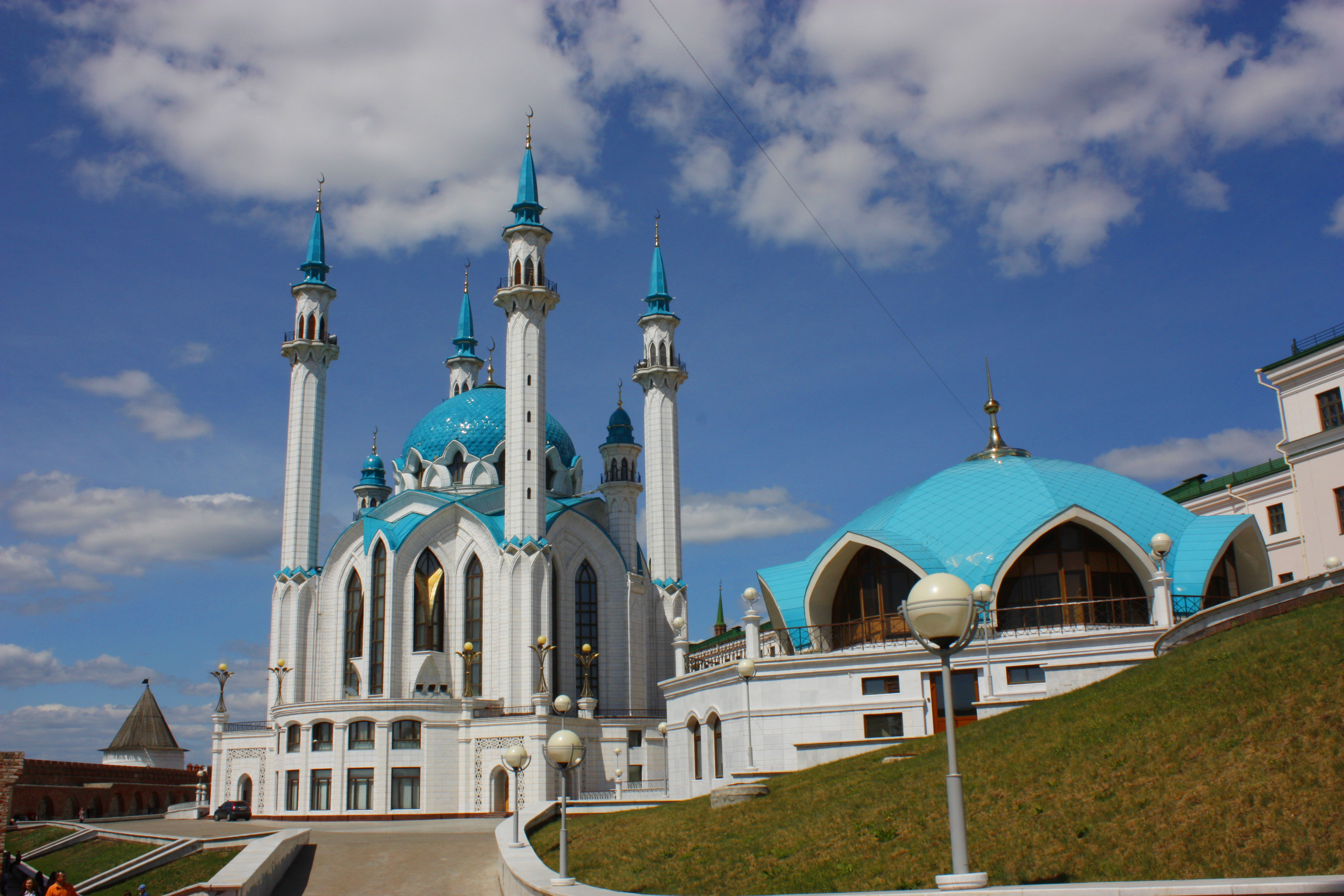
Qolşärif Mosque in Kazan, belonging to the Hanafi school, is one of the largest mosques in Russia.

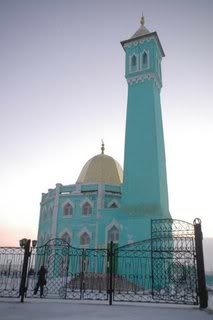
Nord Kamal Mosque in Norilsk, the world's northernmost mosque

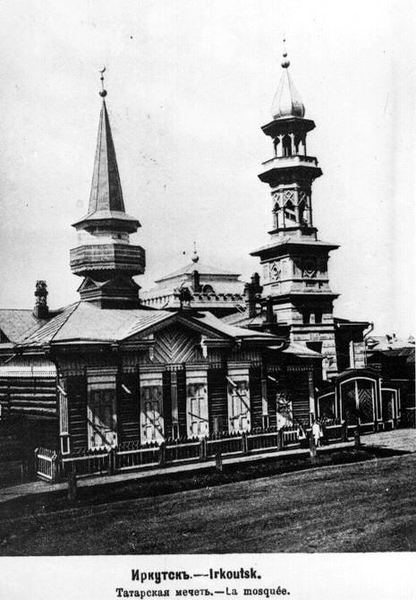
Tatar mosque in Irkutsk, Siberia, 1906

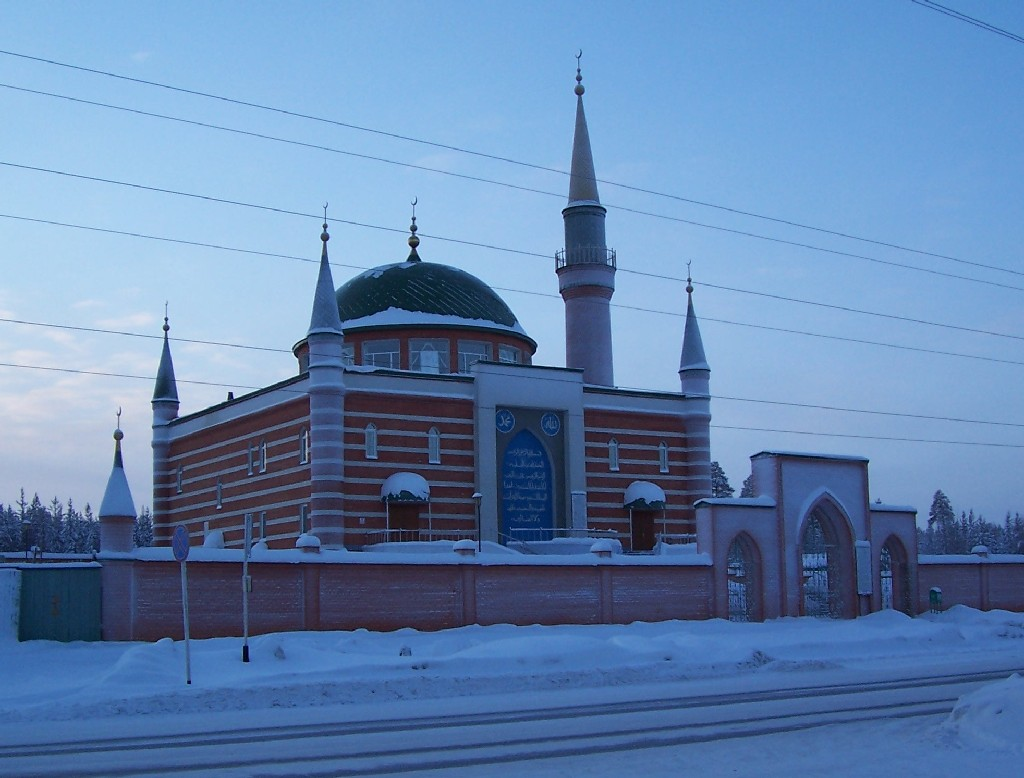
Mosque in Noyabrsk in Siberia's Yamalo-Nenets Autonomous Okrug

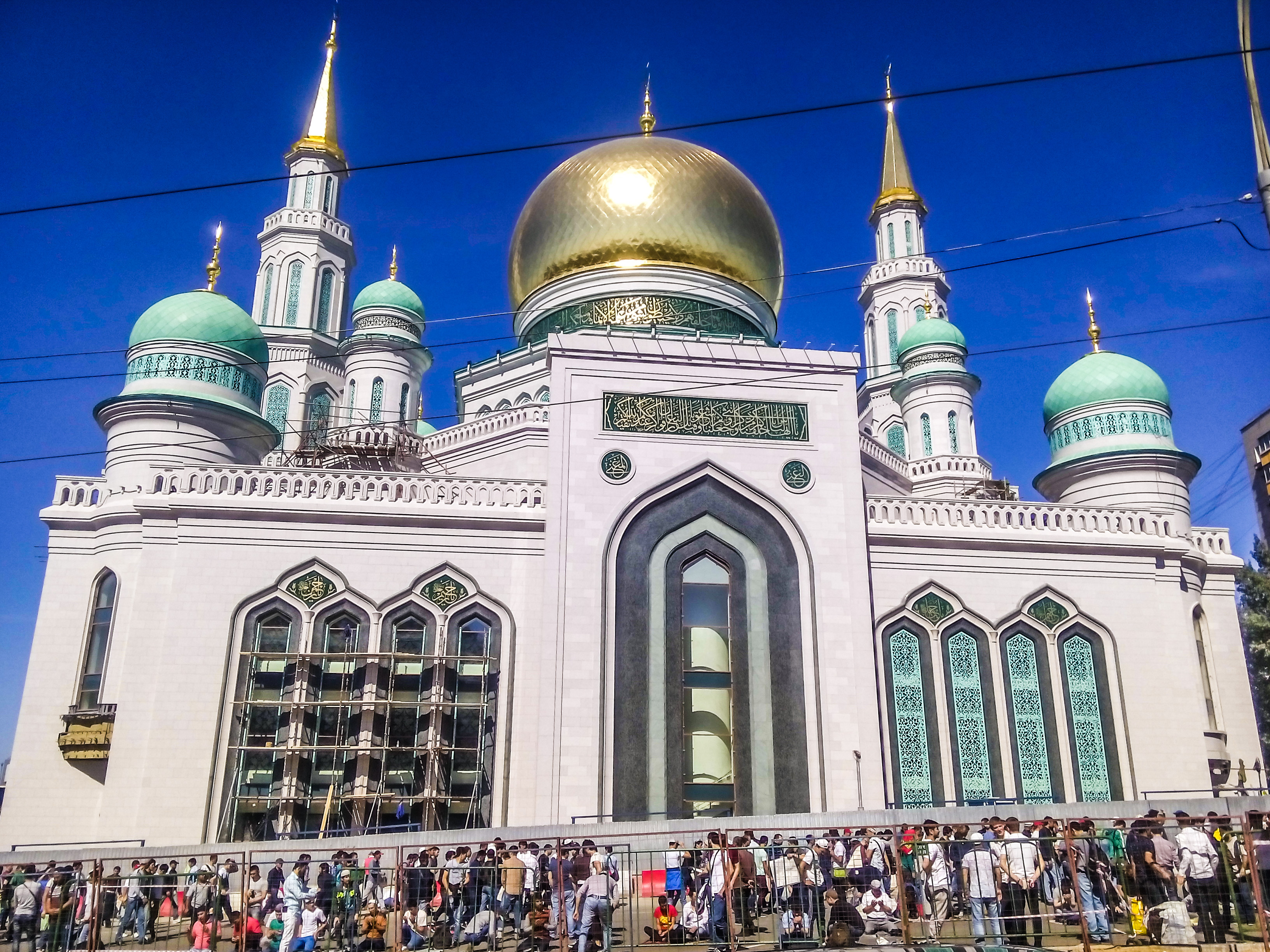
Moscow Cathedral Mosque

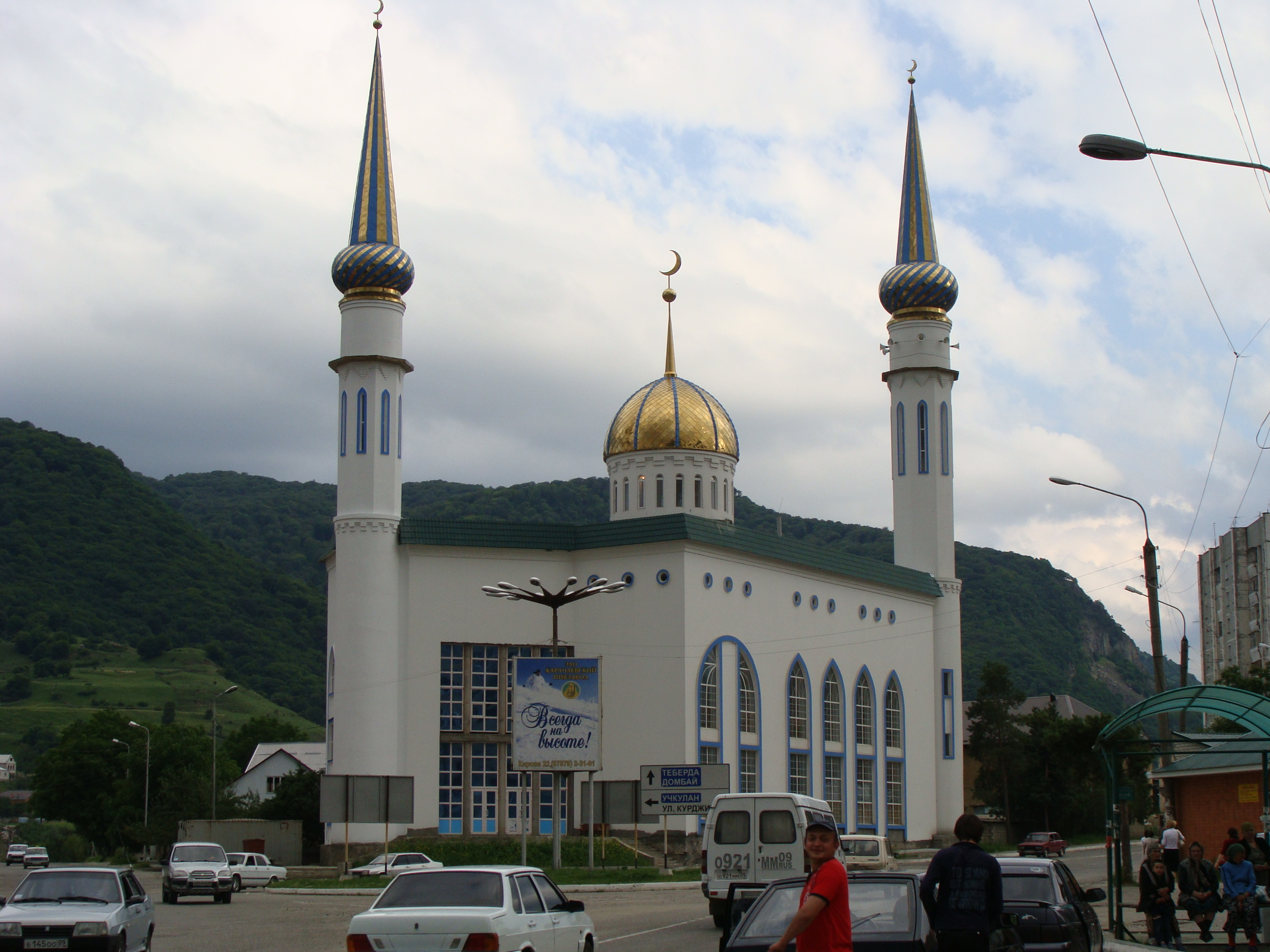
Central mosque of Karachaevsk, Karachaevo-Cherkessia

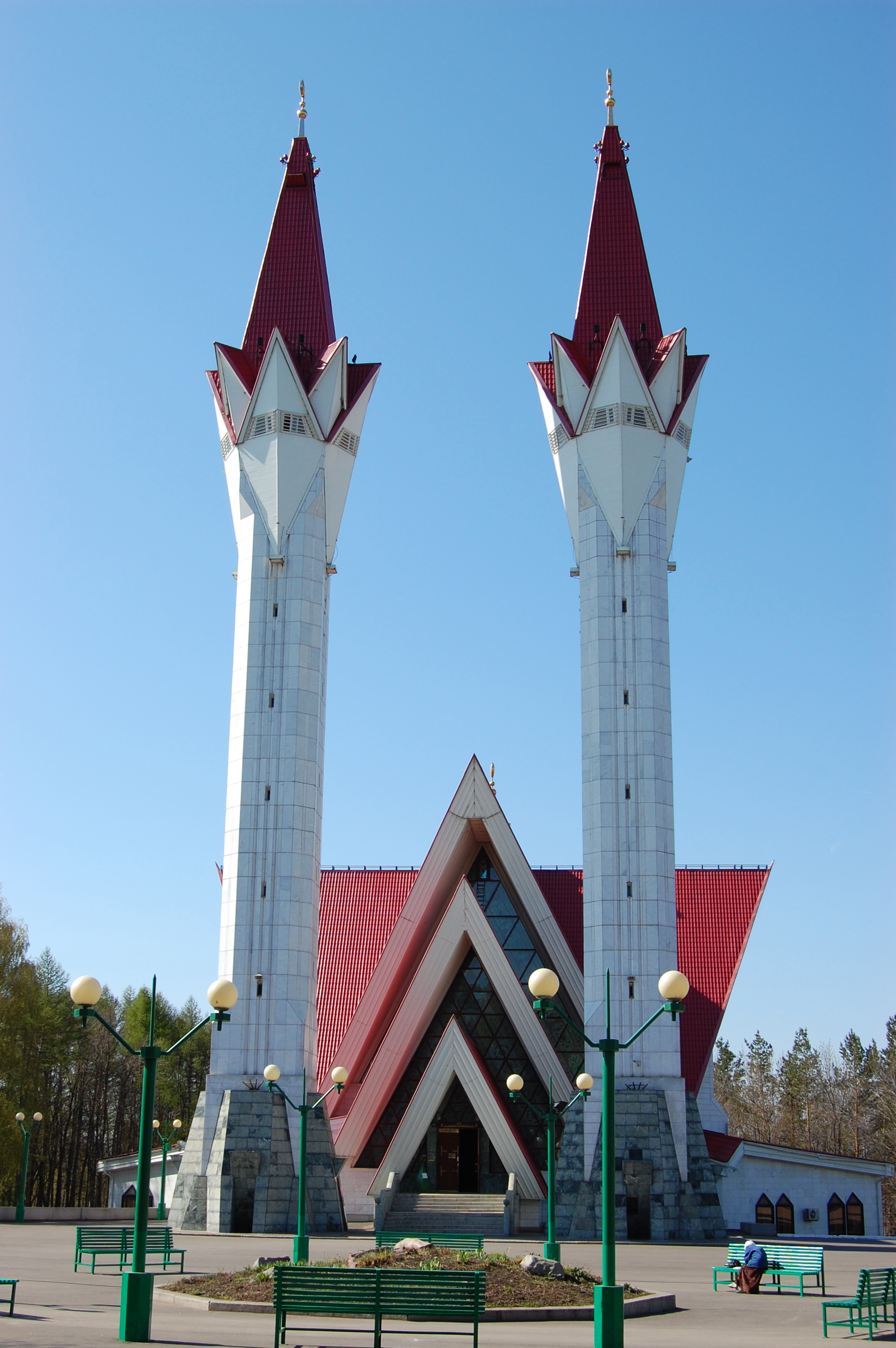
Lala Tulpan in Ufa, Bashkortostan

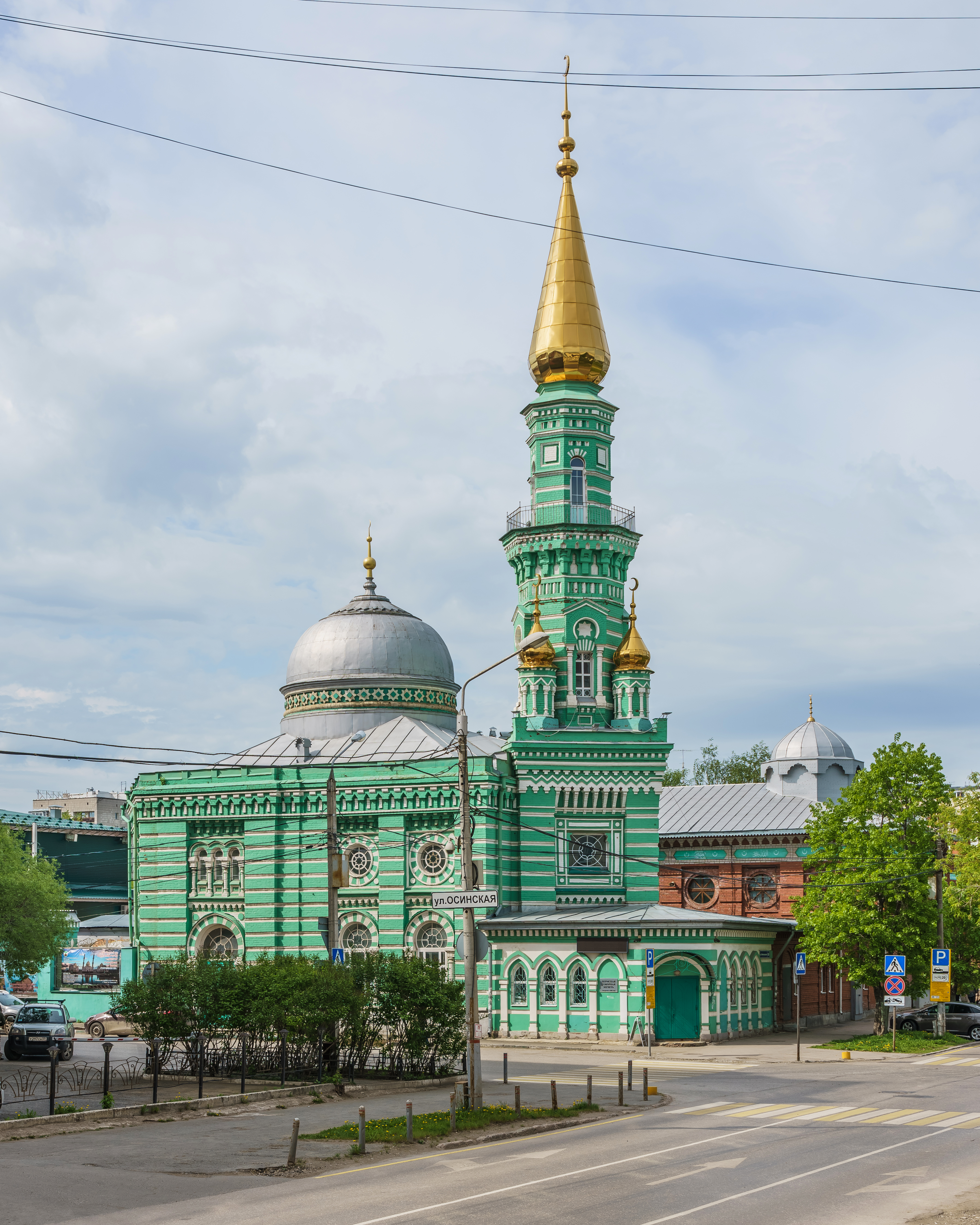
Perm Mosque, Perm Krai

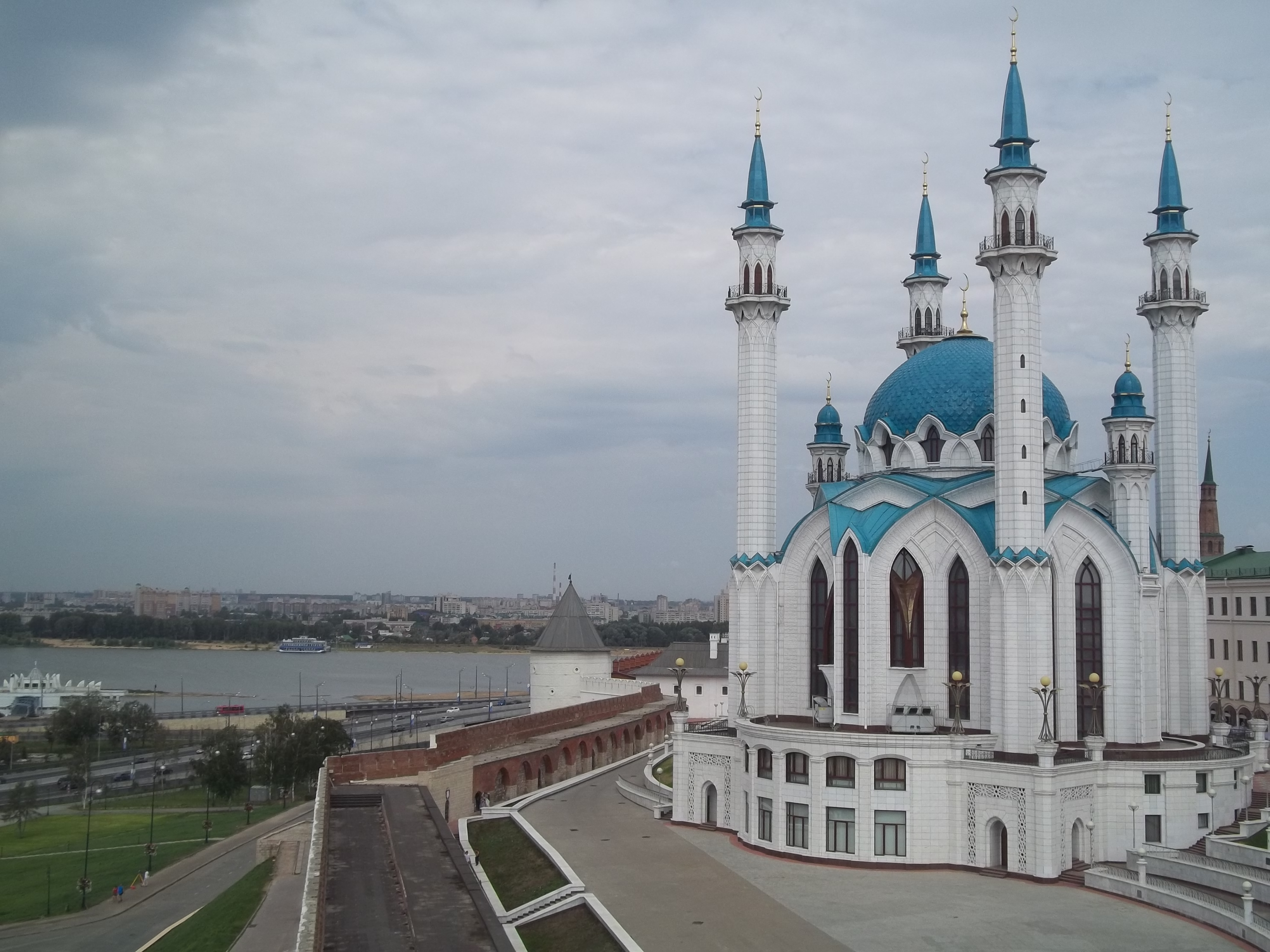
Qolşärif Mosque, Kazan, Tatarstan

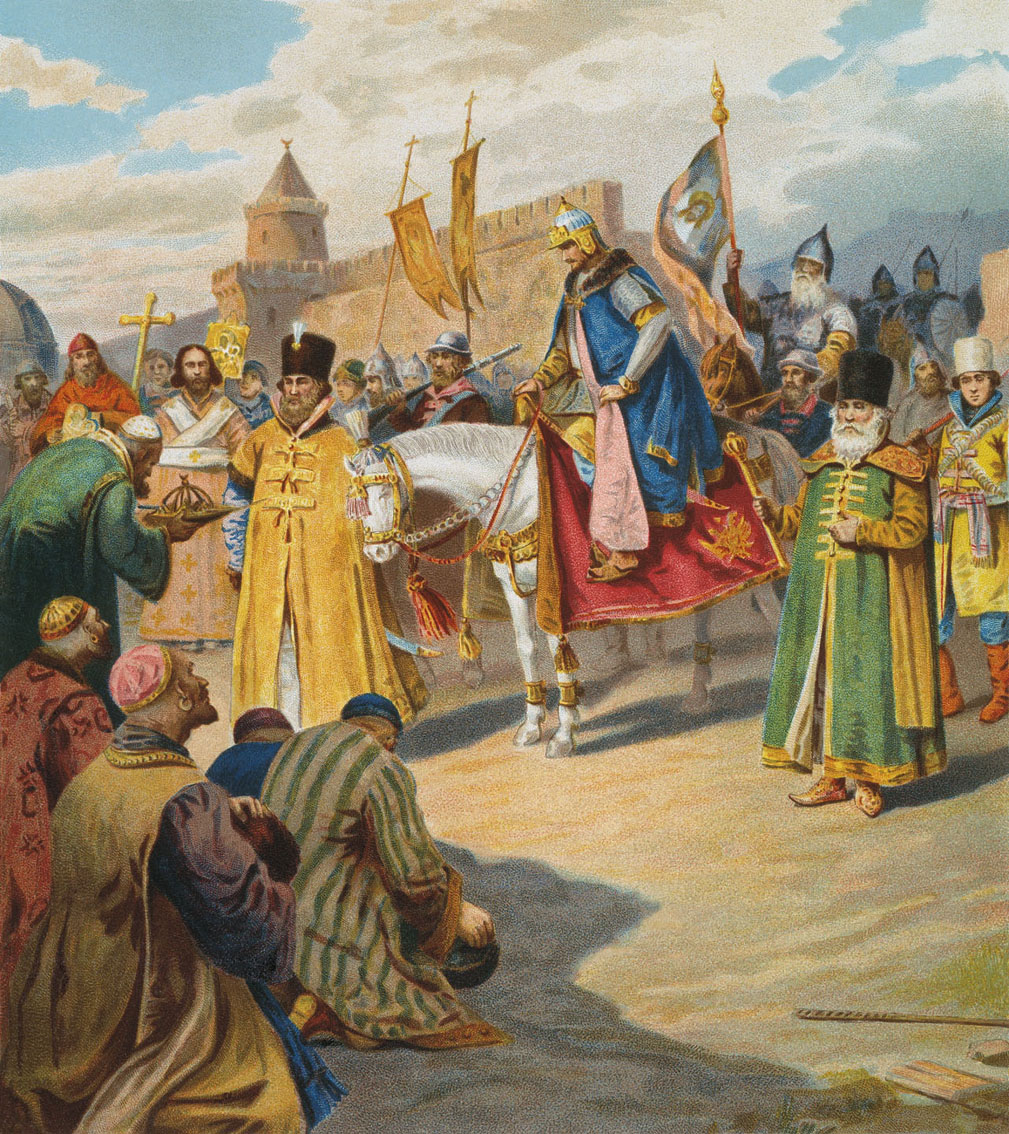
Ivan the Terrible subjugated the Tatars and forcibly converted some of them to Christianity.

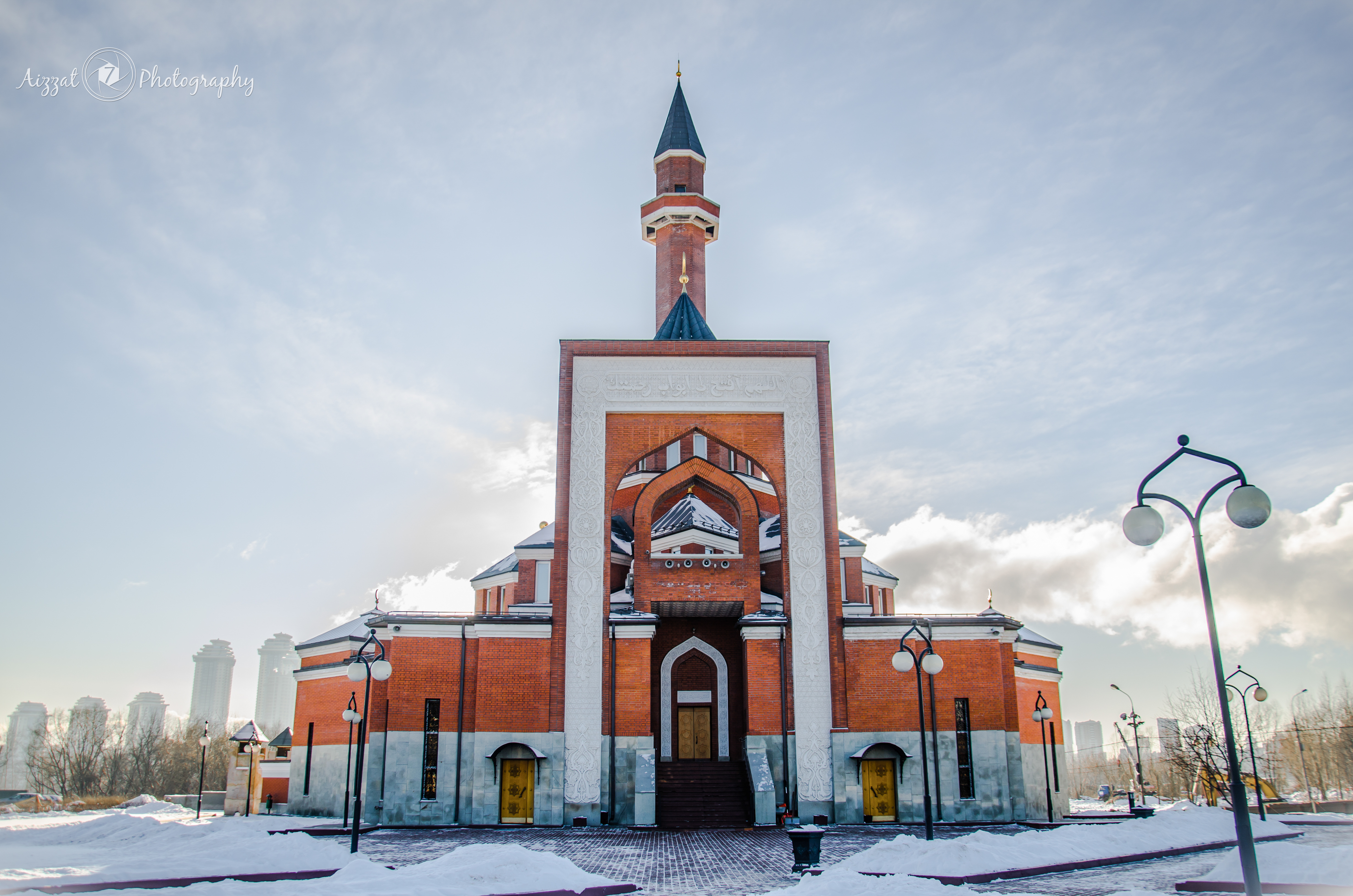
Memorial mosque in Russia

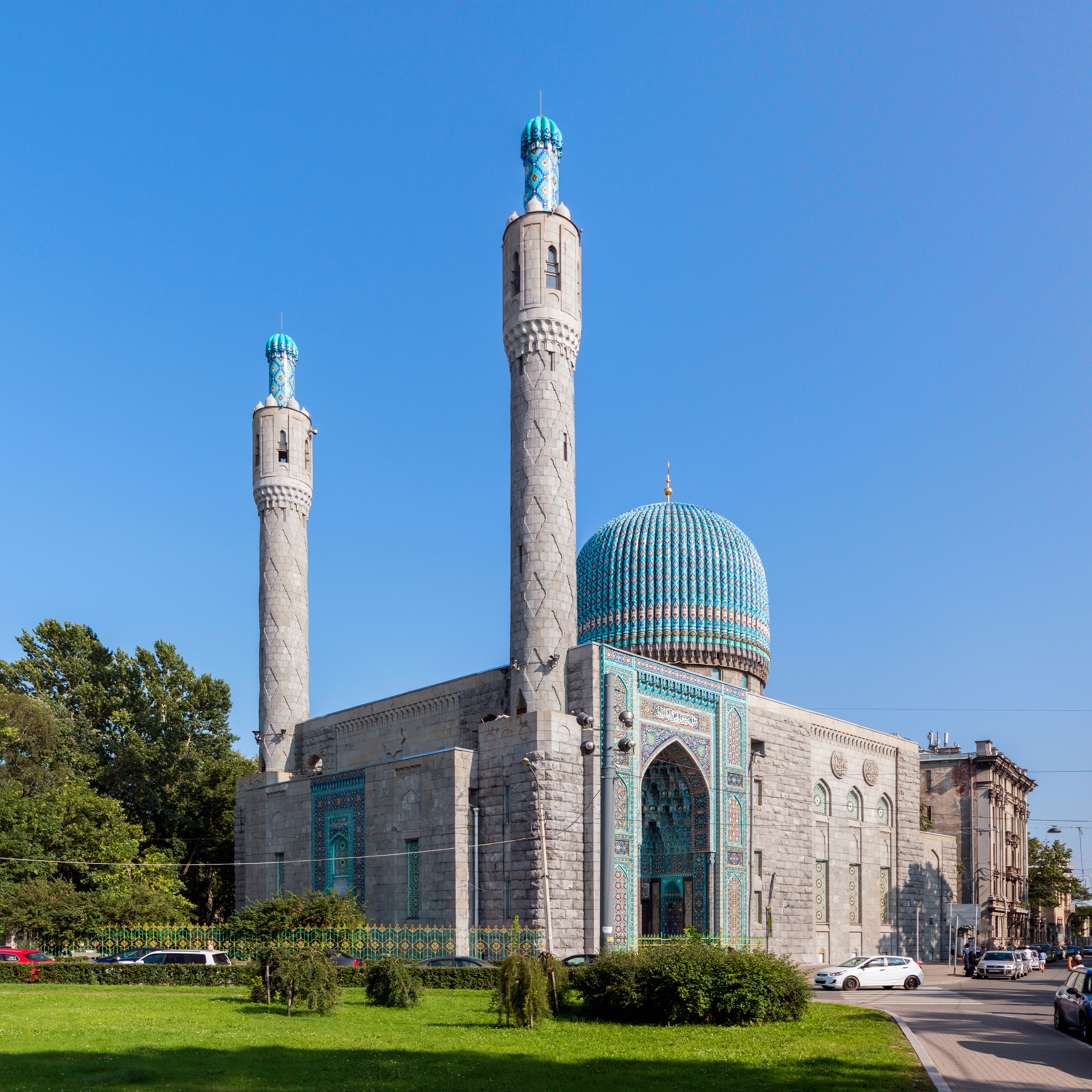
Saint Petersburg Mosque, Saint Petersburg

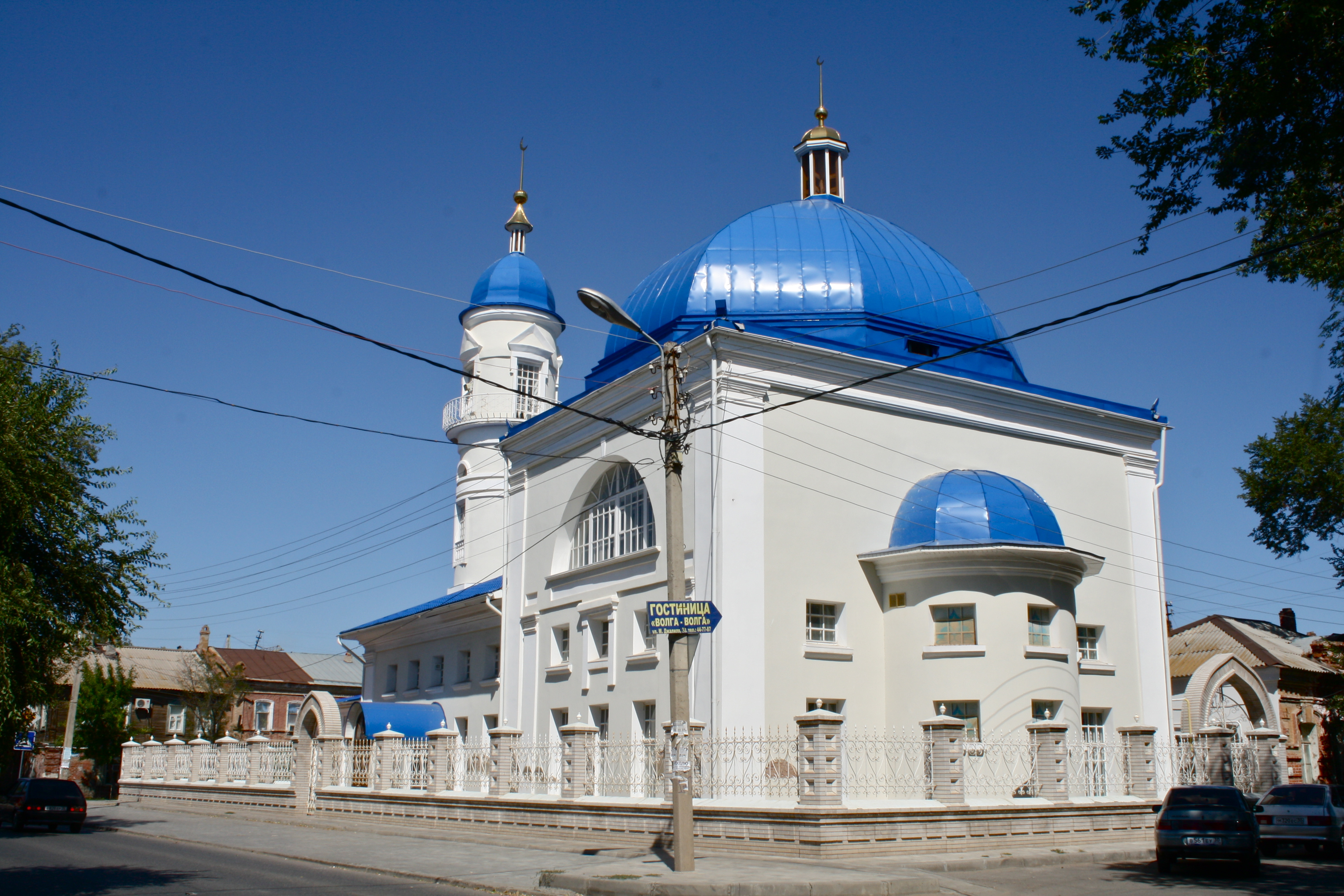
White mosque in Astrakhan

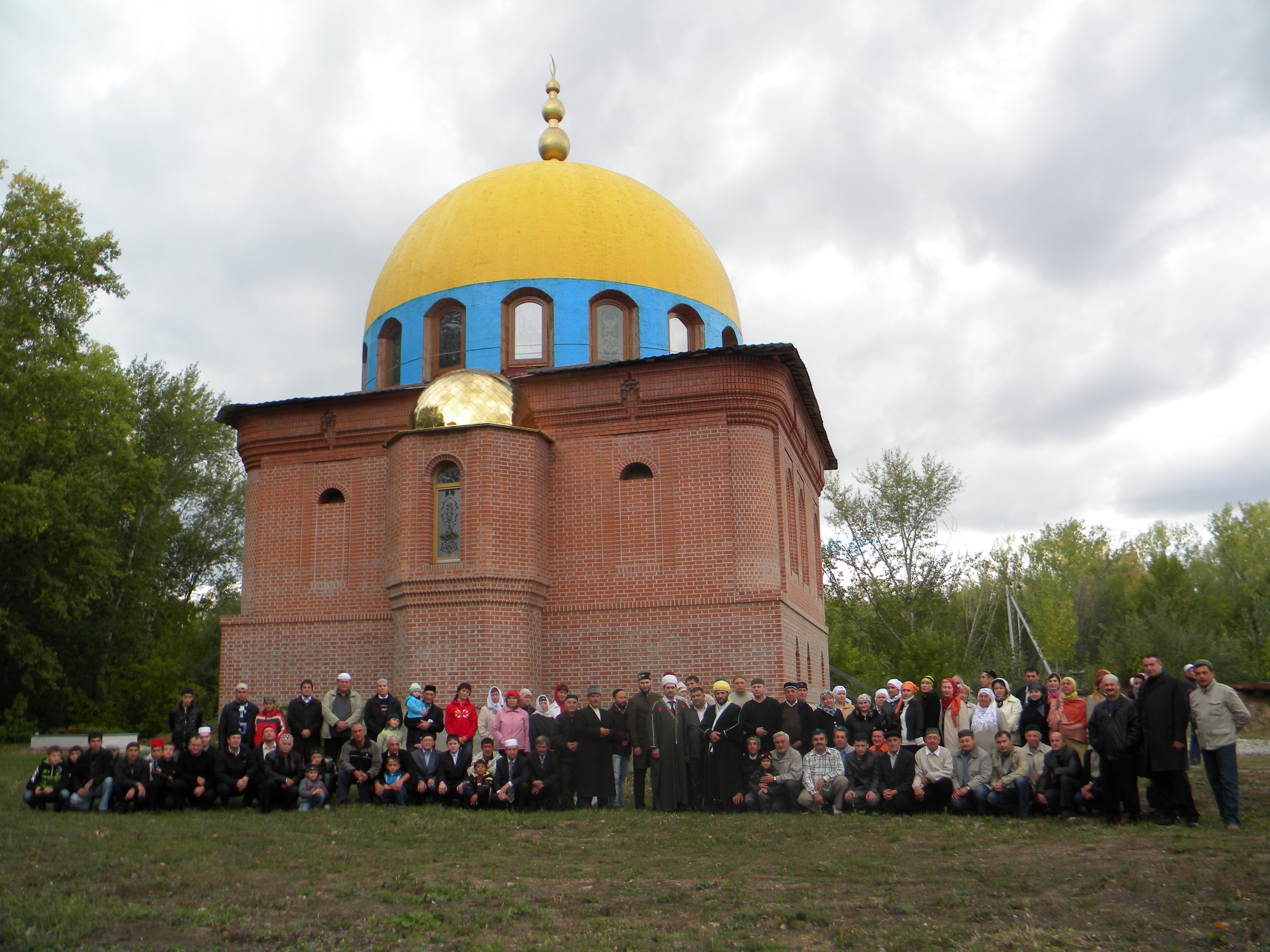
Mosque of Twenty-Five Prophets in Ufa, Bashkortostan

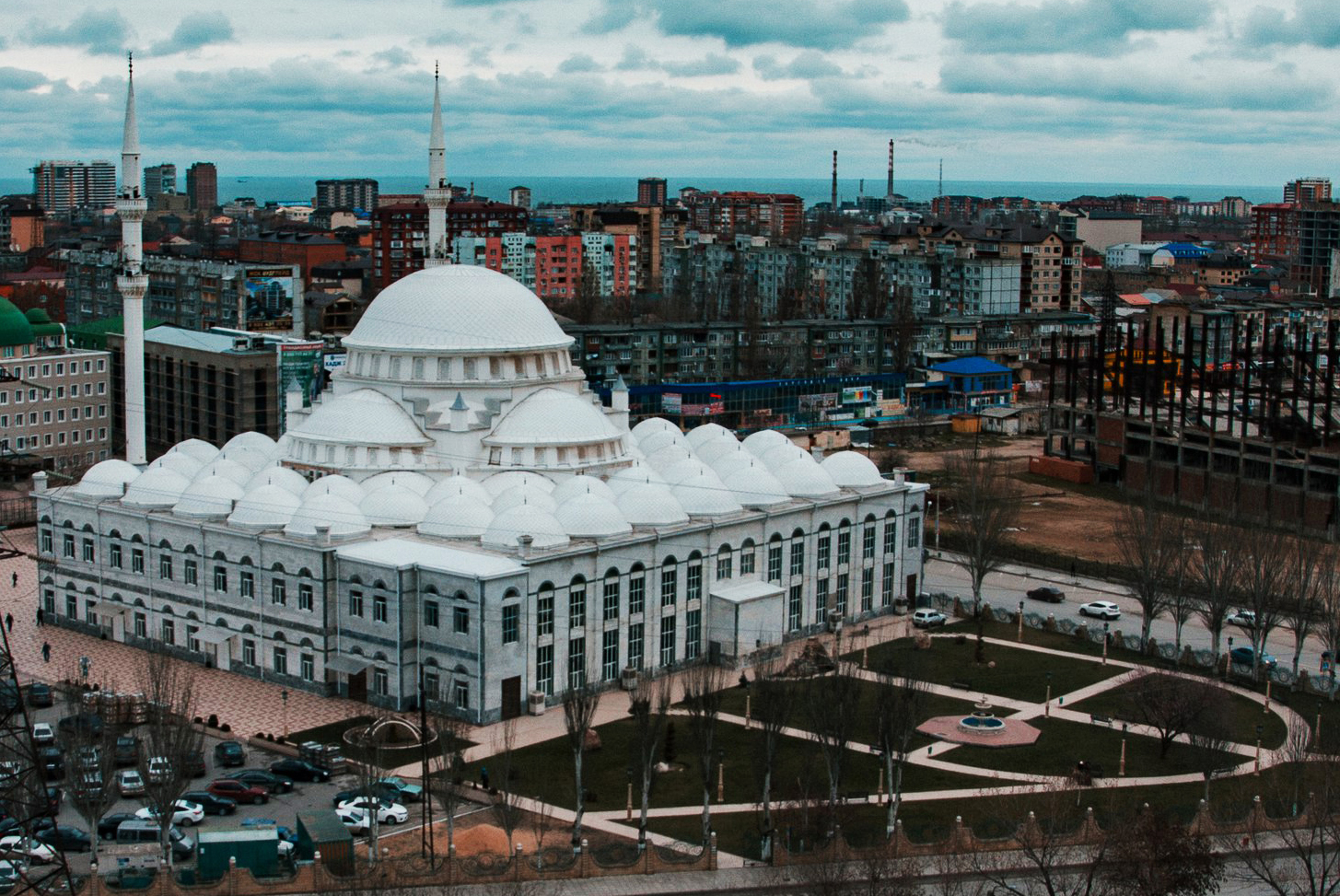
Grand Mosque of Makhachkala in Makhachkala, Dagestan

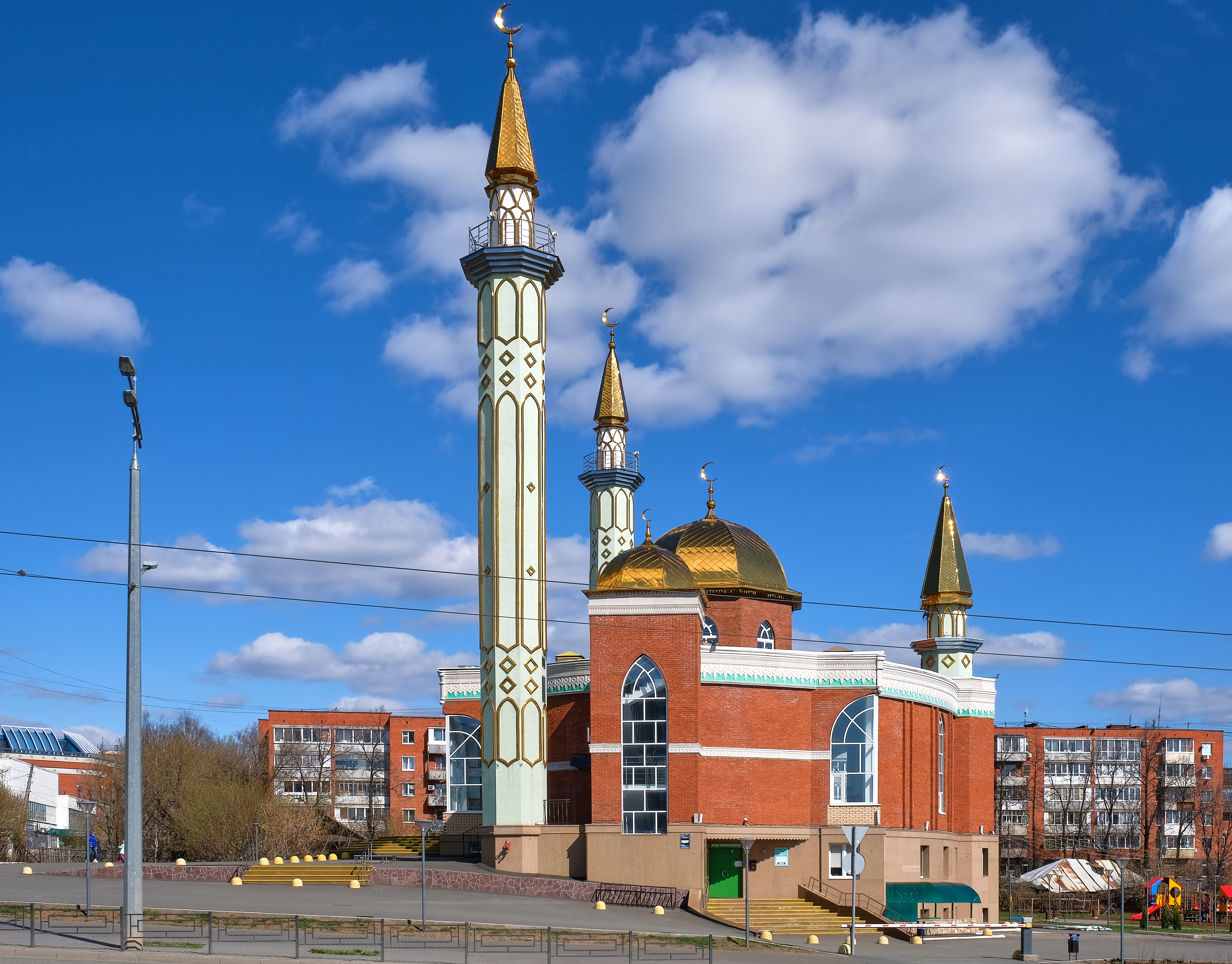
Mosque in Izhevsk, Udmurtia

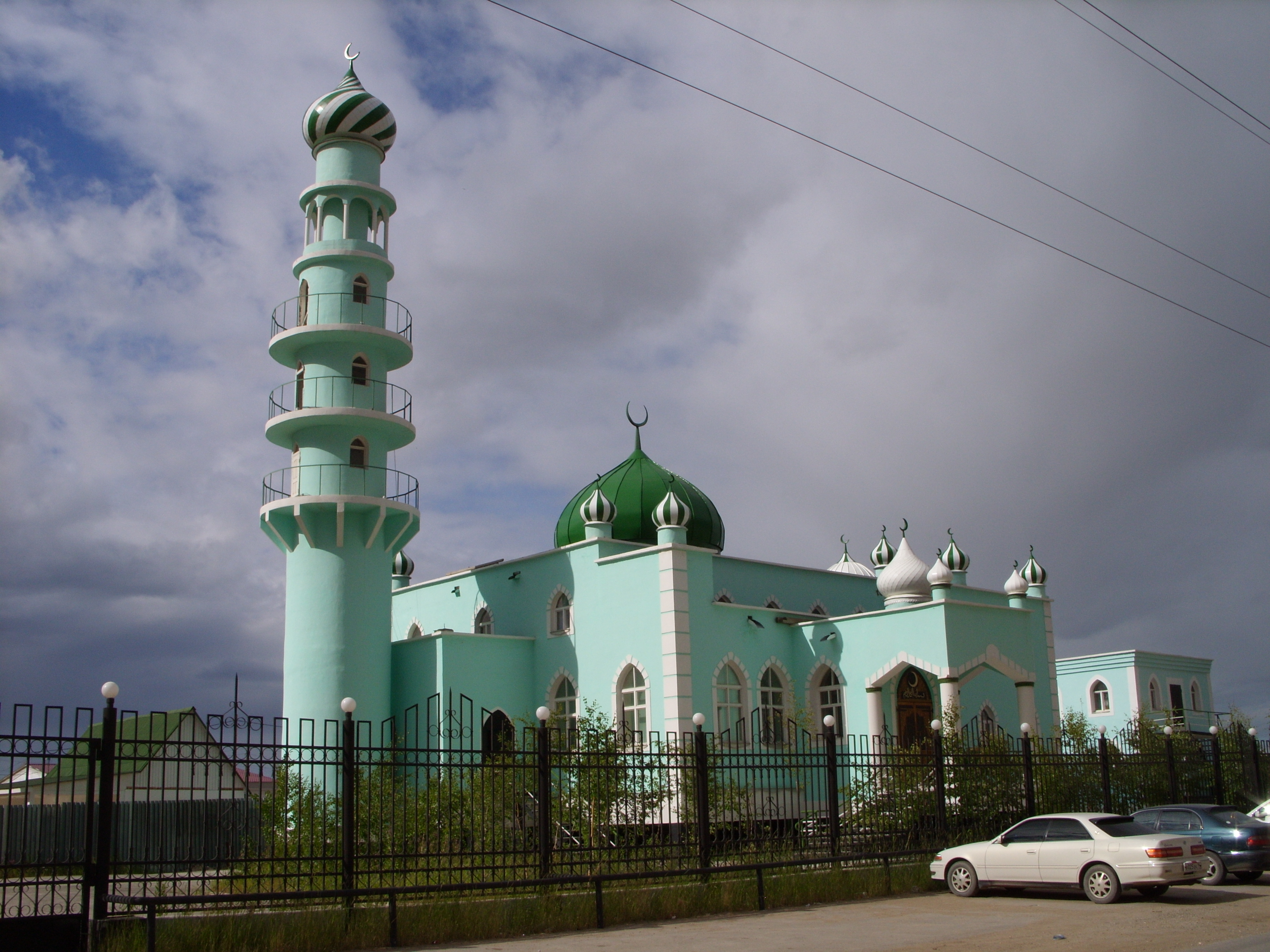
Mosque in Yakutsk, Yakutia

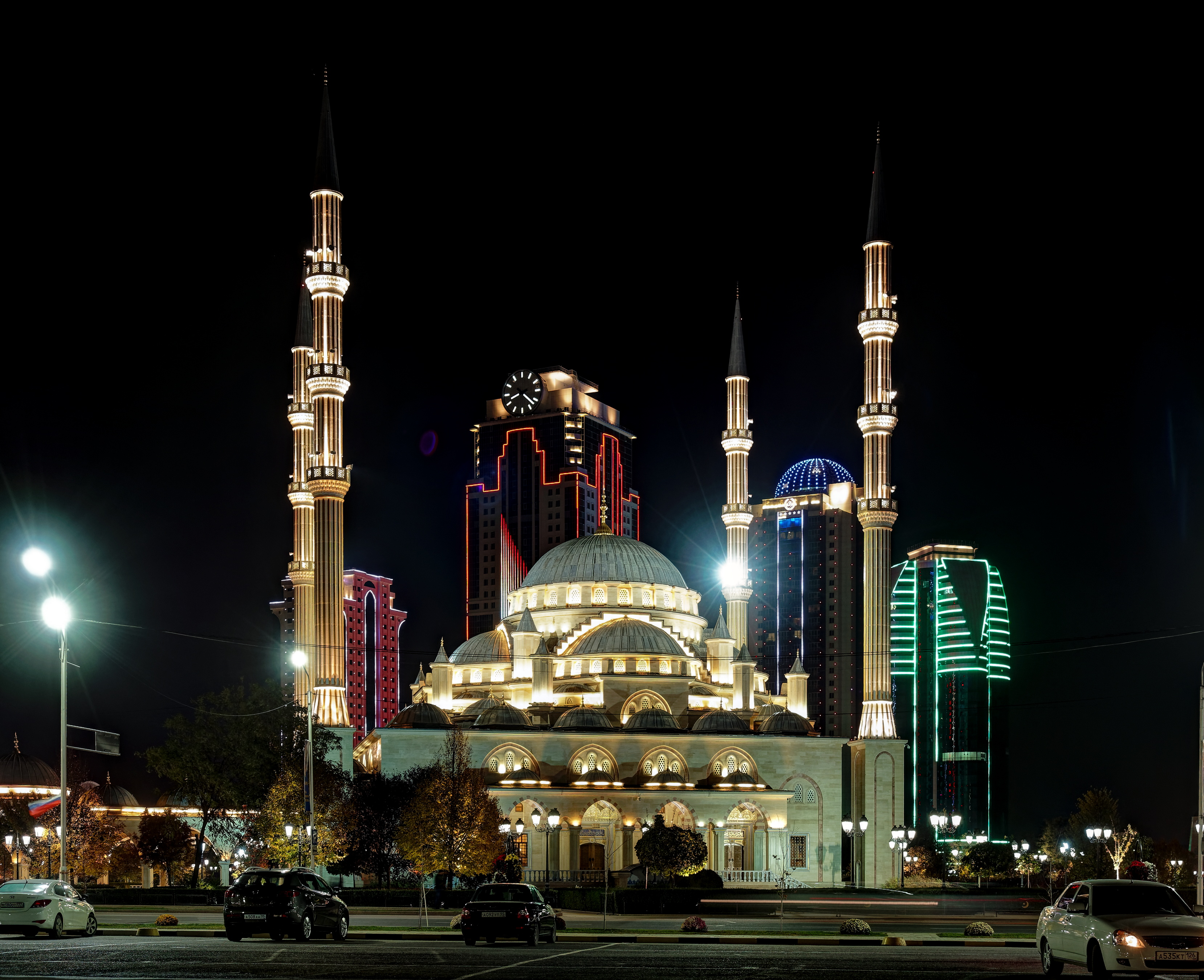
Mosque in Grozny, Chechnya

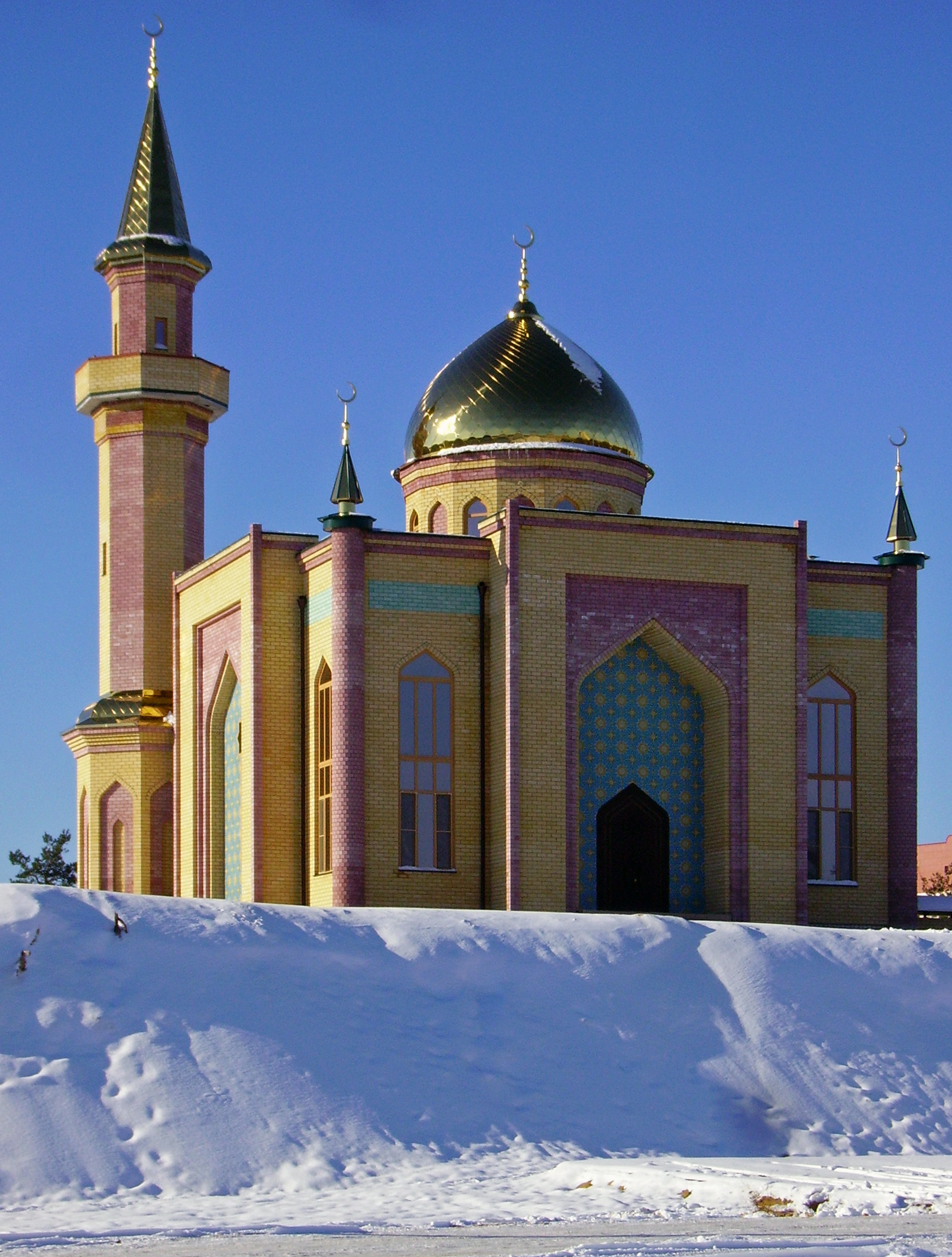
Mosque in Dzerzhinsk, Nizhy Novgorod Oblast

== See also ==
- Blasphemy laws in Russia
- Islam by country
- Islam in Bangladesh
- Islam in China
- Islam in Europe
- Islam in India
- Islam in Indonesia
- Islam in Iran
- Islam in Nigeria
- Islam in Pakistan
- Islam in the Philippines
- List of mosques in Russia
- Islam in the Soviet Union
- Islam in Tatarstan
- Religion in Russia
