= Francis Joseph Fitzgerald =

Canadian police officer (1869–1911)

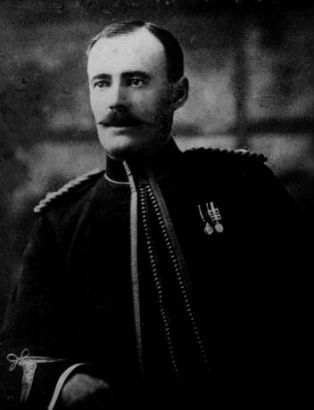
- Insp. Francis Fitzgerald
- Born: 12 April 1869; Halifax, Nova Scotia
- Died: 11 February 1911 (aged 41) beside the Peel River south of Fort McPherson, Northwest Territories
- Resting place: Fort McPherson, Northwest Territories
- Police career
- Country: Canada
- Department: North-West Mounted Police
- Service years: 1888–1911
- Rank: Inspector
- Memorials: Francis Fitzgerald Bridge in the Halifax Public Gardens

Francis Joseph Fitzgerald (12 April 1869 – 11 February 1911) was a Canadian who became a celebrated Boer War veteran and the first commander of the Royal North-West Mounted Police detachment at Herschel Island in the Western Arctic (1903). From December 1910 until February 1911, he led a mail patrol from Fort McPherson southward to Dawson City. When the patrol did not arrive in time, a search party, led by Corporal William Dempster, was sent from Dawson City and found the bodies of Fitzgerald and the other patrol members. The trip became known as "The Lost Patrol" and as "one of Yukon’s greatest tragedies."

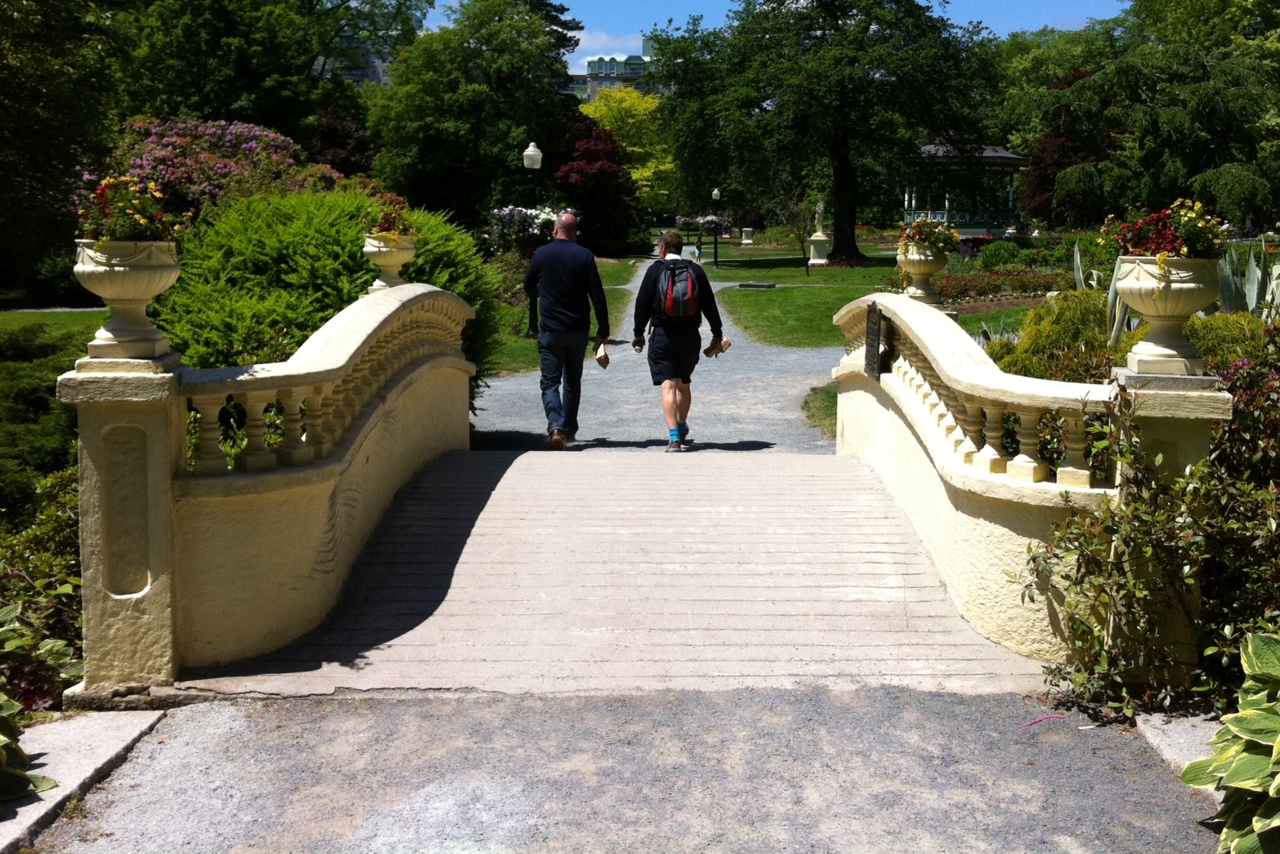
Francis Fitzgerald Bridge, Halifax Public Gardens, Nova Scotia (1911)

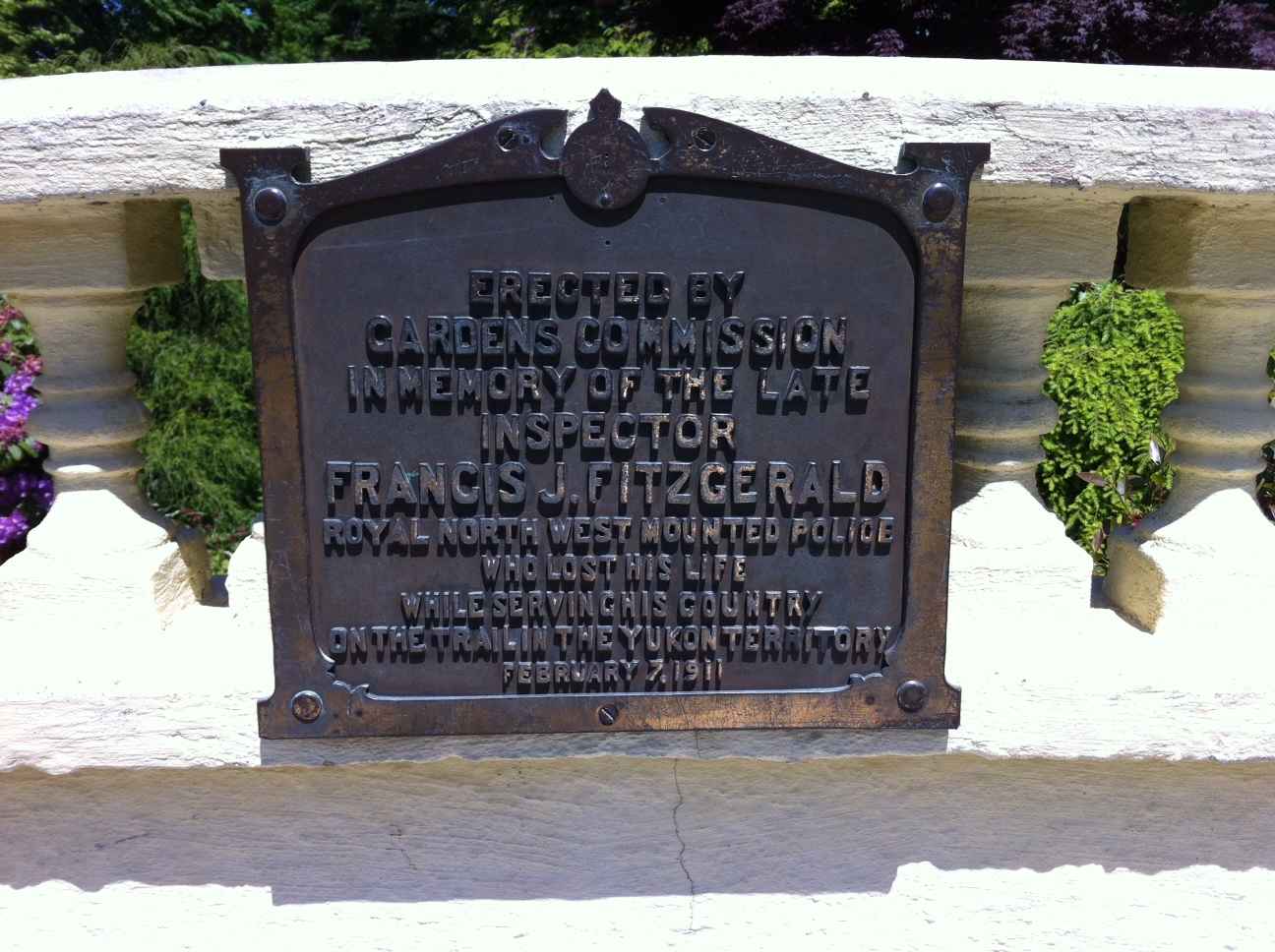
Francis Fitzgerald Bridge Plaque

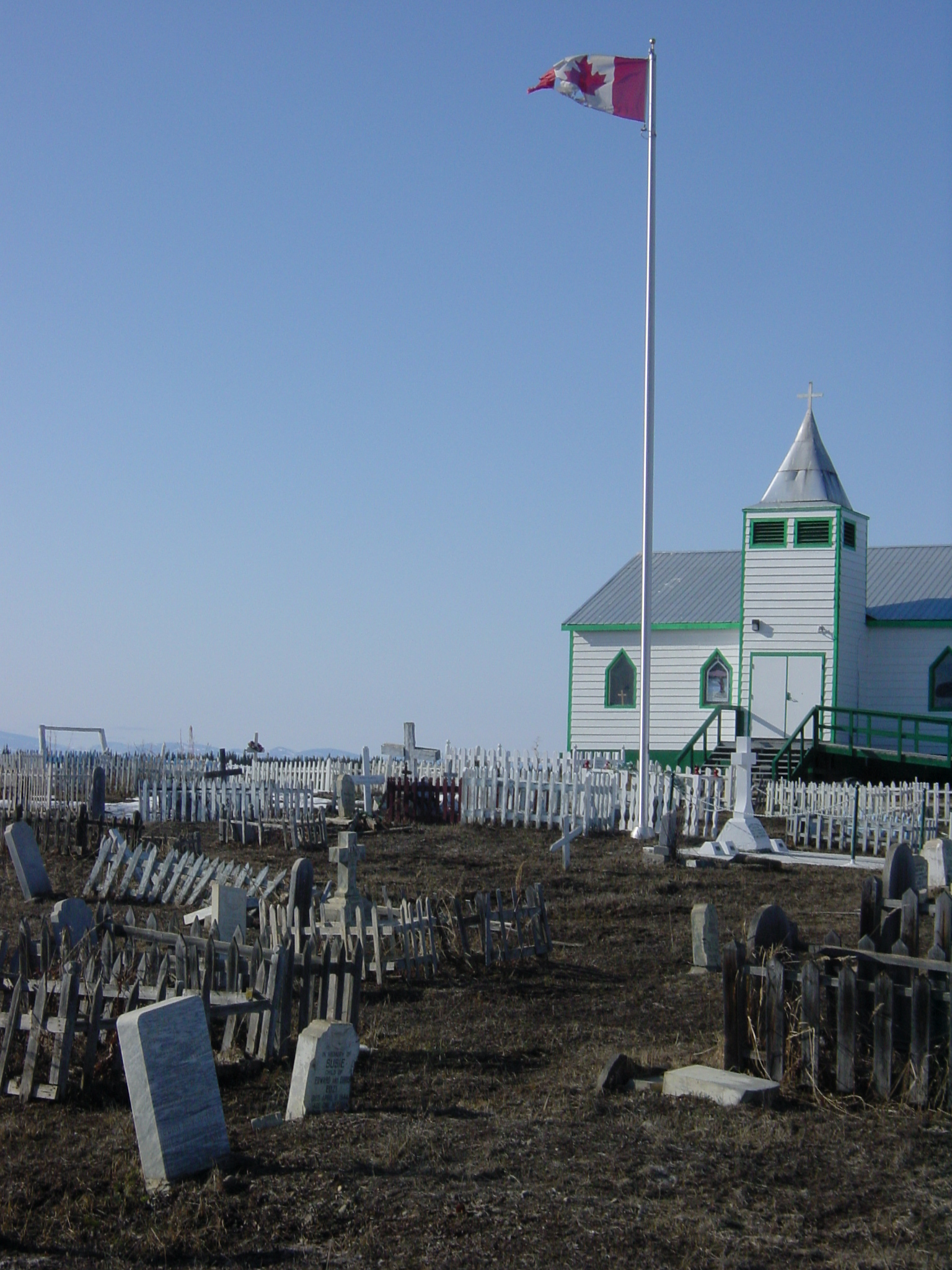
Tomb for "The Lost Patrol", Fort McPherson, Northwest Territories (right of the flagpole)

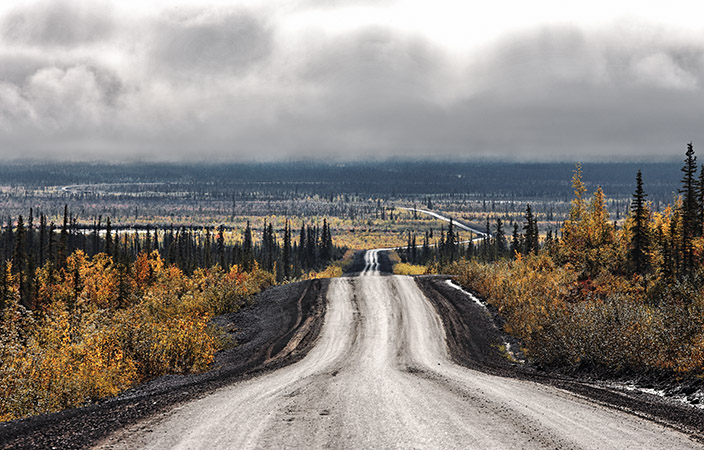
Dempster Highway, south of Inuvik, Northwest Territories, named after Inspector Dempster who found "The Lost Patrol"

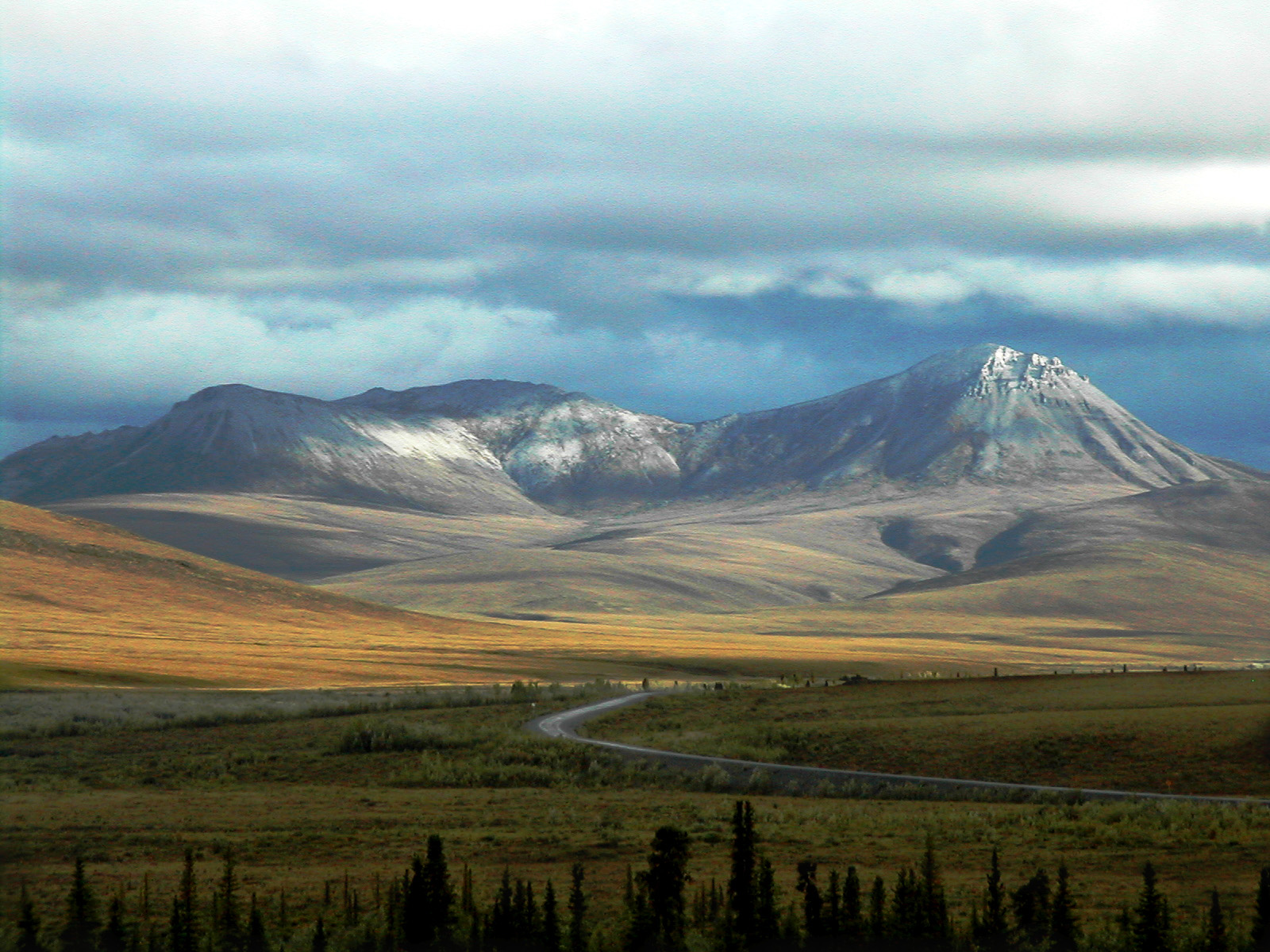
Dempster Highway near the Richardson Mountains

== See also ==
- Military history of Nova Scotia
- History of Yukon
