= William Dempster =

North-West Mounted Police officer in the Yukon Territory (1876–1964)

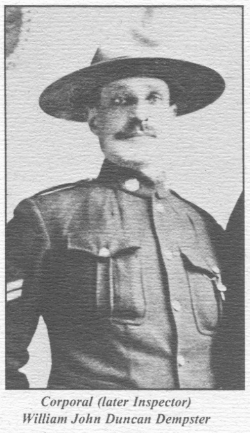
- Born: 21 October 1876; Wales
- Died: 25 October 1964 (aged 88); Victoria, British Columbia, Canada
- Resting place: Burnaby, British Columbia
- Police career
- Country: Canada
- Department: North-West Mounted Police, Royal Canadian Mounted Police
- Service years: 1897–1934
- Rank: Inspector
- Memorials: Dempster Highway

William John Duncan Dempster (21 October 1876 – 25 October 1964) was a member of the North-West Mounted Police (NWMP) in the Yukon Territory during the early 20th century. He led an expedition which found the remains of members of the Lost Patrol, three NWMP officers and an ex-NWMP officer guide who disappeared on the trail between Fort McPherson and Dawson City in the winter of 1910–11. The Dempster Highway in northern Canada is named for him.

== Early life and career ==
Dempster was born in Wales on 21 October 1876. He emigrated to Canada as a young man. In 1897, he joined the North-West Mounted Police and was posted to the Yukon the following year.

He served in various communities in the north for the next ten years. In 1907, he began participating in the annual mid-winter dog sled mail patrols between the NWMP detachments in Dawson City and Fort McPherson, a trip of 800 kilometres (500 mi) through the wilderness.

== The Lost Patrol ==
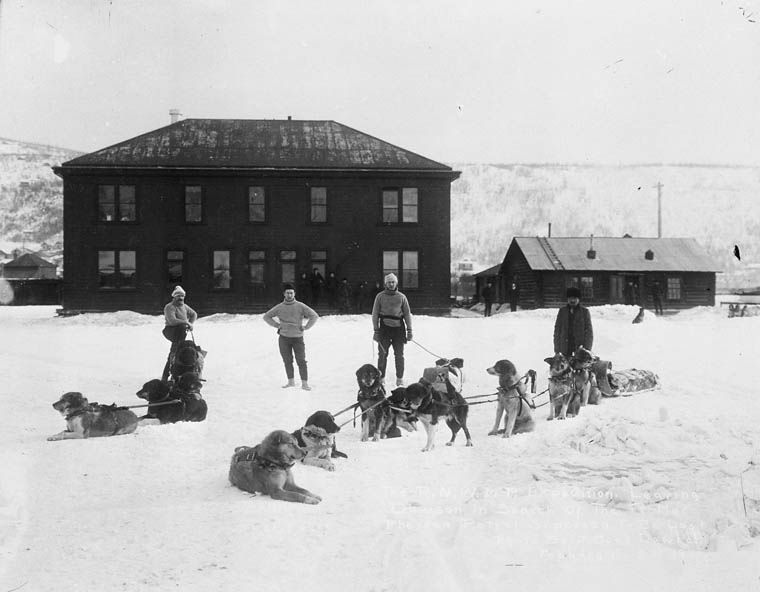
Dempster's patrol at Dawson City, February 1911

In the winter of 1910–11, the mail patrol was commanded by Inspector Francis Joseph Fitzgerald. The patrol included Fitzgerald, Constables George Kinney and Richard Taylor, and former constable Samuel Carter as guide. They left Fort McPherson on December 21, 1910. The time required for the trip depended heavily on the weather; previous patrols had taken as few as 14 days and as many as 56 for the one-way journey. Fitzgerald took enough supplies for 30 days and may have been seeking to set a new speed record for the trip.

Weather conditions on the trail were poor, with heavy snow and low temperatures. Carter, who had only traveled the route in the opposite direction, was not able to find the path through the Richardson Mountains. In late December, the patrol encountered local Kutchin families but Fitzgerald did not choose to hire one as a guide. Conditions worsened after January 3, with temperatures averaging −46 °C (−51 °F) and strong winds. On January 12, with only nine days food remaining, they were still lost. Fitzgerald was determined to continue, and it was not until January 18 that they turned back to Fort McPherson.

When the patrol failed to arrive in Dawson City by late February 1911, Corporal Dempster was dispatched with Constables J.F. Fyfe and F. Turner and First Nations guide Charlie Steward to find and rescue them. They departed Dawson on February 28. Dempster was initially confident of finding the patrol, given Fitzgerald's experience in the north.

Dempster's patrol soon found evidence of trouble, including abandoned dog harnesses and gear, and campsites that showed Fitzgerald's patrol had lost their way. They later found parts of dog carcasses which indicated that the lost men had resorted to eating their sled animals. On March 22 and 23, the bodies of the four missing men were discovered 55 kilometres (34 mi) from Fort McPherson. Dempster's patrol continued to Fort McPherson and then returned to Dawson City. On the return to Dawson, Dempster set a new record, covering the distance in 11 days.

== Later career ==
After the loss of Fitzgerald's patrol, the NWMP tasked Dempster with making the patrol route safer. He worked on this through 1912 and 1913, making trail markers and building supply caches and shelters.

Dempster continued to lead the winter patrols for several years, establishing several speed records, including 14 days in 1920. He was able to achieve his patrols safely, avoiding unnecessary risks and employing local First Nations guides when required. In 1917, he was asked to find a route from the Porcupine River to Dawson that did not cross United States territory. He was able to find a route within three weeks through unexplored parts of the Ogilvie Mountains. First Nations he encountered on the way stated their surprise when his party appeared, saying: "this trail has never been travelled over by white men or Indians, although different parts are travelled by different Indians". The difficulty of the terrain meant that no other patrols were sent on the same route.

He eventually reached the rank of Inspector, retiring from the Royal Canadian Mounted Police (successor to the NWMP) in 1934. At his retirement he was considered to be "the best trail man in the Yukon". Dempster married Catherine Smith in 1926. They had one son and one daughter.

Dempster died October 25, 1964, at the age of 88. Shortly before his death, he was advised that the highway being constructed from Dawson to Aklavik would be named in his honour. The Dempster Highway, eventually routed to Inuvik instead of Aklavik, opened in 1979.
