= Inuvik (disambiguation) =

Inuvik is a city in Canada.

Inuvik can also refer to:

- Inuvik Region, an administrative region in Canada
- Inuvik (electoral district), a former district representing the city, dissolved in 1999
- Inuvik Region, Northwest Territories (former census division), a former census designated statistical area in Canada
- Inuvik (Mike Zubko) Airport, in the city of Inuvik
- Inuvik/Shell Lake Water Aerodrome, an airport south of the city
- CFS Inuvik, a former Canadian Forces signals intercept facility near the city, also known as HMCS Inuvik from 1963 to 1966
- Inuvik (crater), a crater on Mars
