= Alfred Moses (politician) =

Canadian politician (1977–2022)

The Honourable Alfred Moses

Member of the Legislative Assembly of the Northwest Territories for Inuvik Boot Lake
- In office October 3, 2011 – September 2, 2019
- Preceded by: Floyd Roland
- Succeeded by: Diane Thom

Personal details
- Born: July 4, 1977 Fort McPherson, Northwest Territories, Canada
- Died: July 26, 2022 (aged 45) Inuvik, Northwest Territories, Canada

Alfred Moses (July 4, 1977 – July 26, 2022) was a Canadian politician, who was elected to the Legislative Assembly of the Northwest Territories in the 2011 election. He represented the electoral district of Inuvik Boot Lake until his retirement from politics in 2019.

Moses died on July 26, 2022, at the age of 45.
