= Denny Rodgers =

Canadian politician

Denny Rodgers MLA

Member of the Legislative Assembly of the Northwest Territories
- Incumbent
- Assumed office November 14, 2023
- Preceded by: Diane Archie
- Constituency: Inuvik Boot Lake

Personal details
- Born: August 4, 1968 (age 57) Come By Chance, Newfoundland and Labrador
- Party: non-partisan consensus government

Denny Rodgers (born August 4, 1968) is a Canadian politician, who was elected to the Legislative Assembly of the Northwest Territories in the 2023 election. He represents the electoral district of Inuvik Boot Lake.

He is a former mayor of Inuvik.

== Election results ==
2023 Northwest Territories general election: Inuvik Boot Lake
Candidate	Votes	%
Denny Rodgers	210	42.51
Diane Archie (I.C.)	152	30.77
Sallie Ross	132	26.72
Total votes	494	
