= Inuvik Boot Lake =

Territorial electoral district in the Northwest Territories, Canada

Coordinates: 68.3524°N 133.7033°W

Northwest Territories electoral district
- Boundaries of Inuvik Boot Lake

Territorial electoral district
- Legislature: Legislative Assembly of the Northwest Territories
MLA
Denny Rodgers
- First contested: 1999
- Last contested: 2023
- Region: Inuvik Region
- Communities: Inuvik

Inuvik Boot Lake is a territorial electoral district for the Legislative Assembly of the Northwest Territories, Canada. Together with Inuvik Twin Lakes, it is one of two electoral districts that represent Inuvik; both were created in 1999 from the previous monolithic Inuvik riding.

== Geography ==
Inuvik Boot Lake borders Inuvik Twin Lakes to the northwest, west and southwest, bounded by Centennial Street, Reliance Street, Franklin Road, Distributor Street and Water Street. Inuvik Boot Lake is named for Boot Lake in the south of the electoral district.

== History ==
The 2011 election marked the first time that voters in Inuvik Boot Lake actually voted in a territorial election since the 1999 election, as in both 2003 and 2007 the only candidate was Floyd Roland, who was returned by acclamation.

== Members of the Legislative Assembly (MLAs) ==
Name	Elected	Left Office
Floyd Roland	1999	2011
Alfred Moses	2011	2019
Diane Thom	2019	2023
Denny Rodgers	2023	present

== Election results ==
=== 2023 election ===
2023 Northwest Territories general election
Candidate	Votes	%
Denny Rodgers	210	42.51
Diane Archie (I.C.)	152	30.77
Sallie Ross	132	26.72
Total votes	494	

=== 2019 election ===
2019 Northwest Territories general election
Candidate	Votes
Diane Thom	239
Eugene Rees	179
Desmond Loreen	94
Jimmy Kalinek	47

=== 2015 election ===
2015 Northwest Territories general election
Candidate	Votes	%
Alfred Moses	366	88.6%
Desmond Z. Loreen	47	11.4%
Total valid ballots / Turnout	413	43%

=== 2011 election ===
2011 Northwest Territories general election
Candidate	Votes
Alfred Moses	216
Chris Larocque	211
Grant Gowans	63
Paul Voudrach	18

=== 2007 election ===
In this election, no other candidate registered to run for this riding, so Floyd Roland was returned by acclamation.

2007 Northwest Territories general election
Candidate	Votes
Floyd Roland	Acclaimed
Source(s) "Official Voting Results 2007 General Election" (PDF). Elections NWT. Archived from the original (PDF) on 16 July 2011.

=== 2003 election ===
In this election, no other candidate registered for this riding, so Floyd Roland was returned by acclamation.

2003 Northwest Territories general election
Candidate	Votes
Floyd Roland	Acclaimed
Source(s) "Official Voting Results 2003 General Election" (PDF). Elections NWT. Archived from the original (PDF) on 6 July 2011.

=== 1999 election ===
In the 1999 election, the main issue territory-wide was the question of native self-government and control over the Northwest Territories' resources. The Legislative Assembly of the Northwest Territories runs on a consensus government model, so no political parties exist; although some groups have attempted to revive a partisan legislature, to date such attempts have failed.

1999 Northwest Territories general election
Candidate	Votes	%
Floyd Roland	350	83.33%
Mary Beckett	50	11.90%
Chris Garven	20	4.76%
Total valid ballots / Turnout	420	69.90%
Rejected ballots	5	
Source(s) "Official Voting Results 1999 General Election" (PDF). Elections NWT. Archived from the original (PDF) on 11 April 2008.

== See also ==
- List of Northwest Territories territorial electoral districts
- Canadian provincial electoral districts
