= Vertical Distribution of Ice in Arctic Clouds =

German atmospheric research project

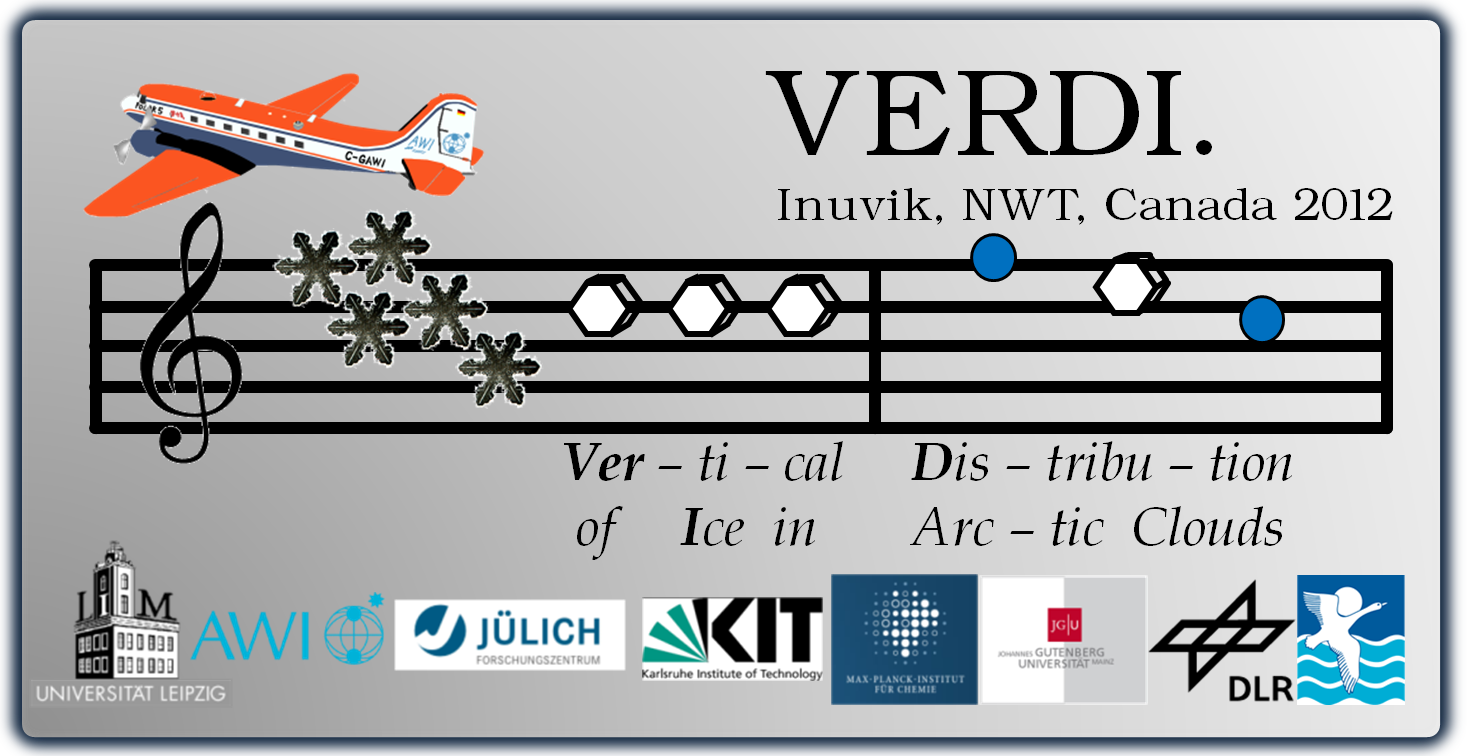
Logo of the Research Project VERDI

Vertical Distribution of Ice in Arctic Clouds (VERDI) is the name of a German research project on the topic of Arctic clouds. Measurements within this project were conducted in April and May 2012 around Inuvik, Canada, organized by the University of Leipzig. The project aims at an improvement of knowledge about the effects of clouds in the Arctic climate system. The main question within VERDI is the distribution of ice crystals and liquid water droplets within the clouds. That distribution depends on various parameters, such as temperature and the cloud's life cycle.

== Measurements ==
During VERDI, airborne observations were conducted inside and above low-level Arctic clouds. Their properties were characterized in detail. The observation methods included remote sensing (both active and passive) covering a large cloud extent, as well as in-situ probing of cloud droplets and ice crystals. The measurements were conducted on board of the research aircraft Polar 5 (call sign C-GAWI) of the Alfred Wegener Institute for Polar and Marine Research, which was based in Inuvik, Canada, for the measurements. The measurement flights were located in the south-eastern Beaufort Sea north of the Mackenzie Delta in the Northwest Territories. Altogether, sixteen flights were conducted between 21 April and 17 May 2012.

== Funding ==
VERDI has been funded by the Alfred Wegener Institute for Polar and Marine Research, by the German Research Foundation (DFG), by Forschungszentrum Jülich (FZJ), and by the Karlsruhe Institute of Technology (KIT). In addition, the Max Planck Institute for Chemistry in Mainz, the Johannes Gutenberg University of Mainz and the Institute of Atmospheric Physics of the German Aerospace Center. Logistically, the campaign was supported by the Aurora Research Institute in Inuvik.
