= Dempster Highway =

Highway in Yukon Territory and Northwest Territories, Canada

Dempster Highway
- Yukon Highway 5 Northwest Territories Highway 8

Route information
- Maintained by Department of Highways and Public Works
- Length: 737.5 km (458.3 mi) YT-5: 465 km (289 mi); NWT-8: 271 km (168 mi)

Major junctions
- South end: Hwy 2 (Klondike Highway) near Dawson City, YT
- North end: Highway 10 (Inuvik–Tuktoyaktuk Highway), Inuvik, NT

Location
- Country: Canada
- Province: Yukon

Highway system
- Territorial highways in Yukon; Miscellaneous
- Northwest Territories highways
← Hwy 4	→ Hwy 6
← Highway 7	→ Highway 9

The Dempster Highway, also referred to as Yukon Highway 5 and Northwest Territories Highway 8, is a highway in Canada that runs from the Klondike Highway in Yukon east to Inuvik, Northwest Territories on the Mackenzie River delta. The highway crosses the Peel and the Mackenzie rivers using a combination of seasonal ferry services and ice bridges. Year-round road access from Inuvik to Tuktoyaktuk opened in November 2017, with the completion of the Inuvik–Tuktoyaktuk Highway, creating the first all-weather road route connecting the Canadian road network with the Arctic Ocean.

The highway is named for North-West Mounted Police (NWMP) officer William Dempster, who discovered the fate of a lost NWMP patrol in 1911.

== Route description ==
The highway begins 40 km (25 mi) east of Dawson City, Yukon on the Klondike Highway. There are no highway or major road intersections along the highway's route. It extends 736 km (457 mi) in a north-northeasterly direction to Inuvik, Northwest Territories, passing through Tombstone Territorial Park and crossing the Ogilvie and Richardson mountain ranges.

== History ==
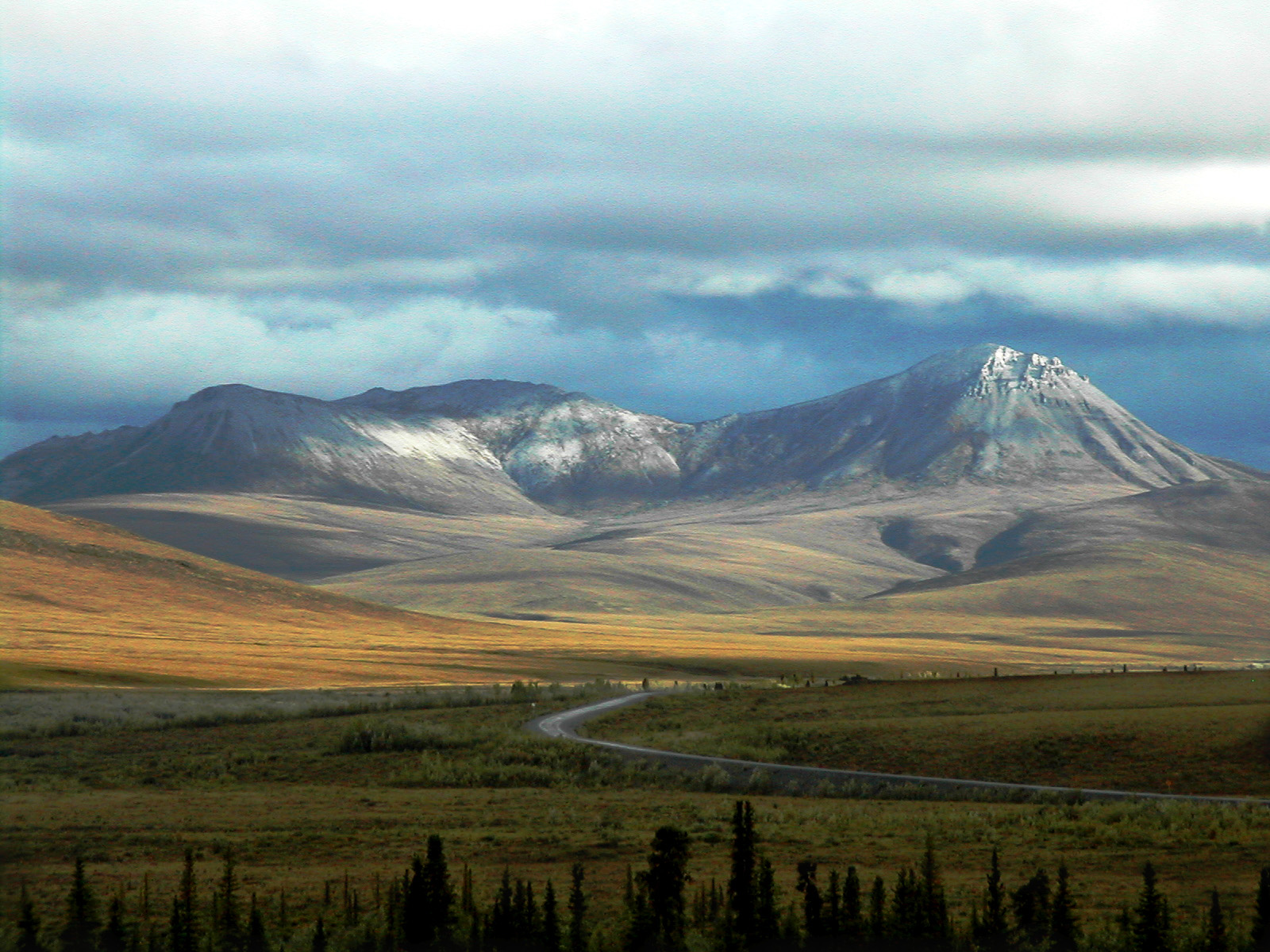
Dempster Highway near the Richardson Mountains

The Dempster Highway roughly follows an old dog sled route from Dawson City to Fort McPherson and is named for Corporal (later Inspector) William Dempster of the North-West Mounted Police.

During the late 19th century, and in response to the Klondike Gold Rush, the North-West Mounted Police established a presence in the Yukon and Northwest Territories. Their activities included winter dog sled patrols between outposts and communities. One such patrol followed a route from Dawson City to the NWMP outpost at Fort McPherson, established in 1903.

In December 1910, NWMP Inspector Francis Joseph Fitzgerald led three men on the annual winter patrol from Fort McPherson to Dawson City. They became lost on the trail, and subsequently died of exposure and starvation. When they failed to arrive in Dawson City as expected, Corporal Dempster and two constables were sent out on a rescue patrol in March 1911. Dempster and his men found the bodies of Fitzgerald's patrol on March 22, 1911.

== Construction ==
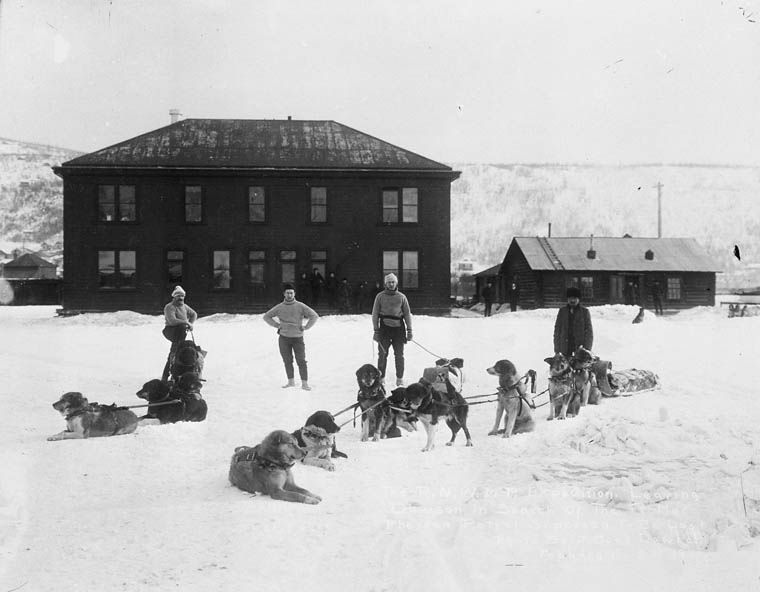
Expedition by Cpl. William Dempster in search of the Lost Patrol, Dawson City, Yukon Territory, 1911.

In 1958, as oil and gas exploration were expanding in the Mackenzie Delta, the Canadian government decided to build a road from Dawson City in Yukon to Aklavik in the Northwest Territories. The road was intended as an overland, year-round supply link to southern Canada. Survey work began in 1958.

With the August, 1959, discovery of oil in the Eagle Plains area, the government granted concessions to the oil industry to stimulate more exploration in the area. This provided more motivation for a road to transport equipment, infrastructure, and revenue to and from the sites. Construction of the road, then known as Yukon Territorial Road No. 11, began at Dawson City in January 1959. The northern terminus of the road was changed to the new town of Inuvik. Due to high costs and ongoing funding disagreements between the federal and Yukon governments, progress was slow until 1961. Once the Eagle Plains oil discovery was found to have no commercial potential, construction stopped in 1962 after 115 km (71 mi) of roadbed had been built.

Seasonal maintenance of the existing road continued but no further work was done. In 1964, the road was renamed the Dempster Highway, after petitions by Vancouver Yukoners Association and the Yukon Order of Pioneers. Construction resumed in 1970 as the Canadian government sought to assert sovereignty over their Arctic territories after the American discovery of oil and gas deposits at Prudhoe Bay, Alaska in 1968. Work was further motivated by speculation that an oil pipeline might be built in the Mackenzie Valley.

At the time of its construction, the highway was the most northerly major road project to date. Weather and daylight conditions presented challenges. In 1979, a work crew was trapped in a blizzard in the Richardson Mountains and was almost lost. Construction had to account for the permafrost; heat transfer from the highway to the ground had to be prevented so the permafrost would not melt. To address this, the road was built on top of a gravel berm, ranging from 1.2 to 2.4 m (3 ft 11 in to 7 ft 10 in), to insulate the permafrost from the road above. Some construction was completed by the Canadian Forces; 3 Field Squadron, RCE from CFB Chilliwack built bridges over the Ogilvie River in 1971 and the Eagle River in 1977.

The final section of road was completed in 1978, at a cost of $132 million. The highway was officially opened on August 18, 1979, at Flat Creek, Yukon.

== Gallery ==
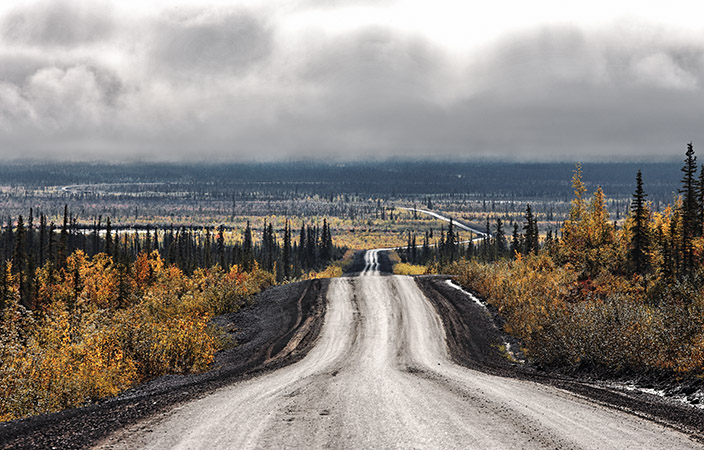
Dempster Highway south of Inuvik

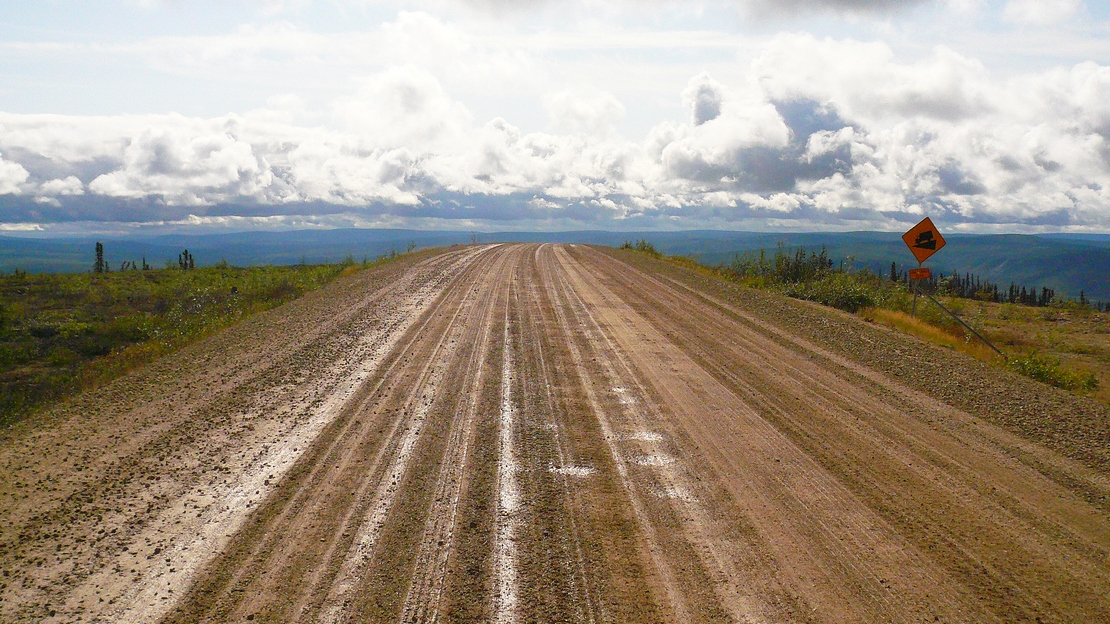
Dempster Highway

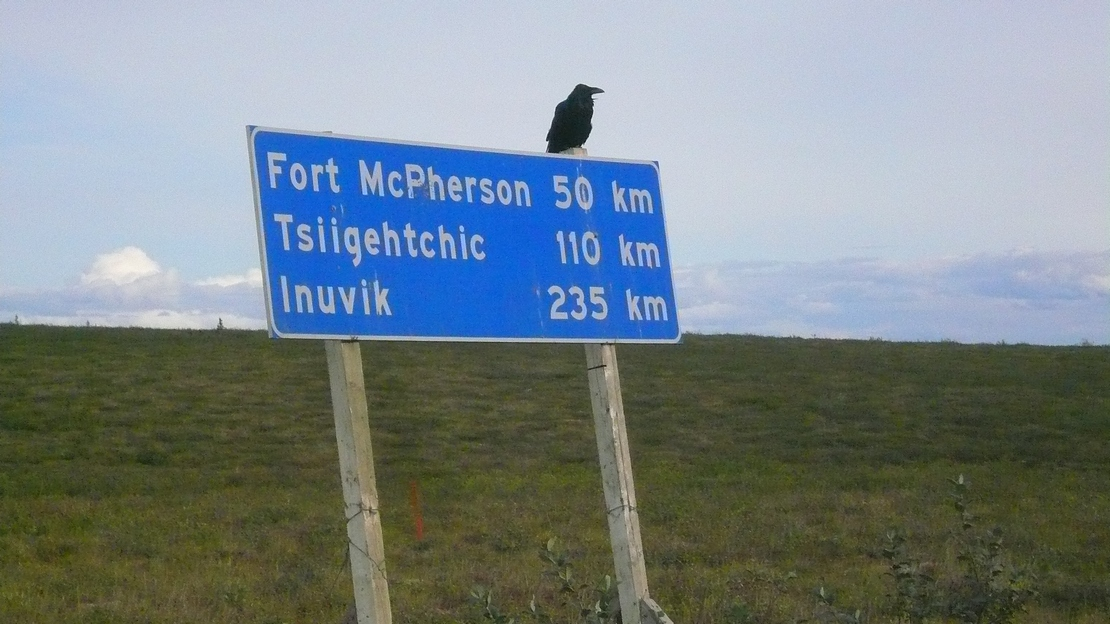
Sign on Dempster Highway

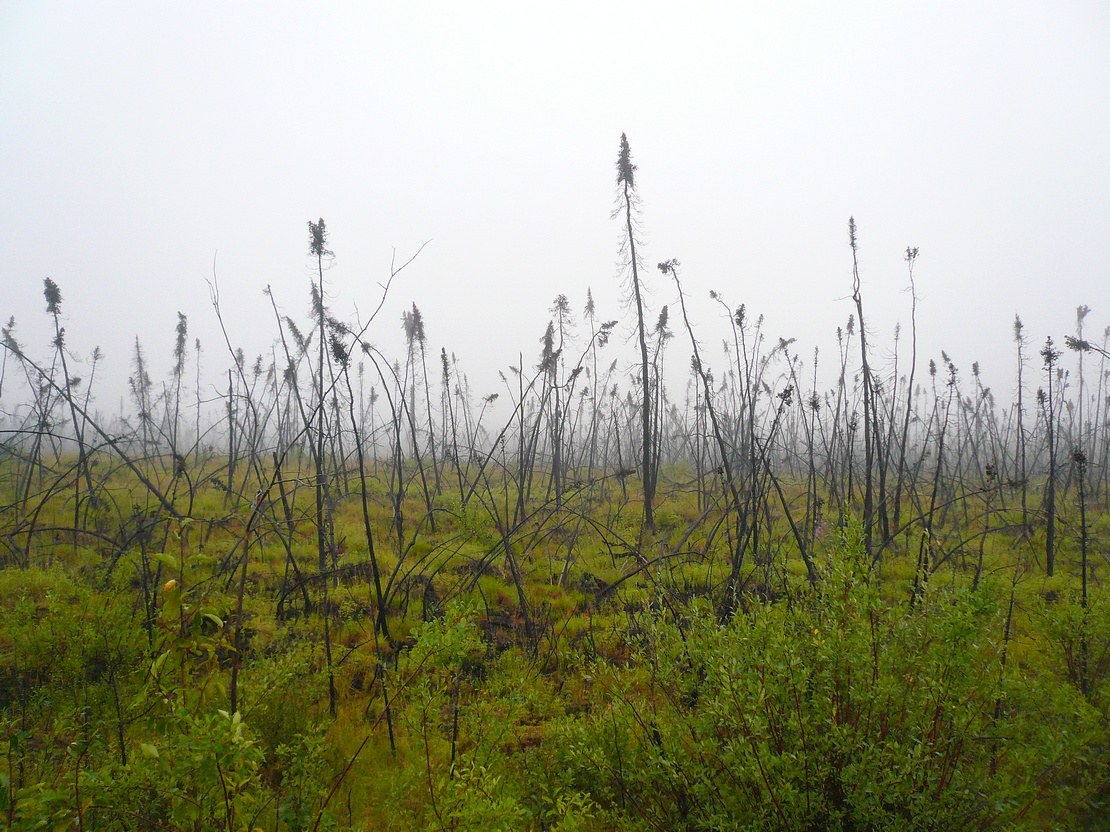
Arctic spruce

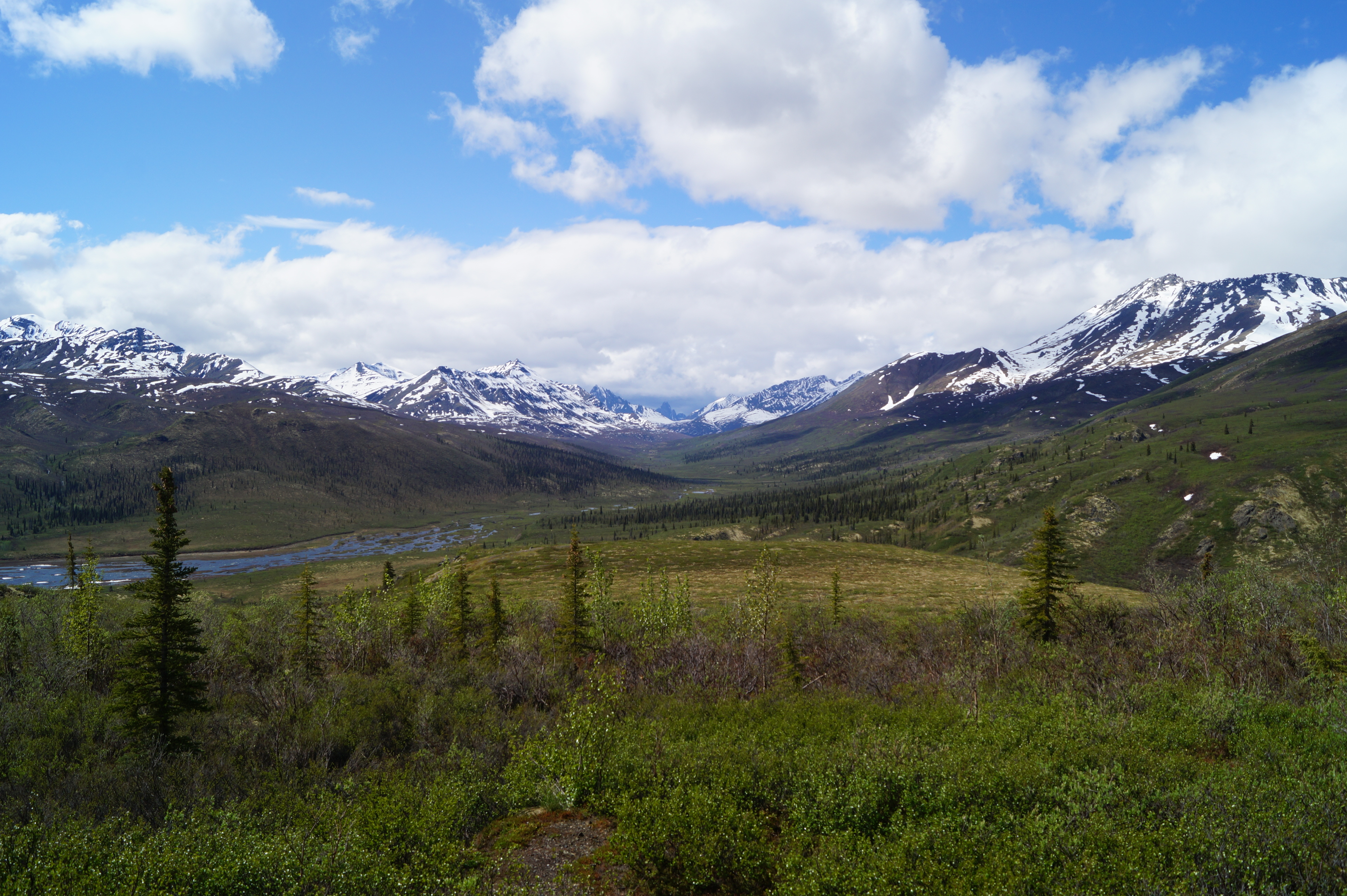
Mt. Tombstone in Tombstone Territorial Park

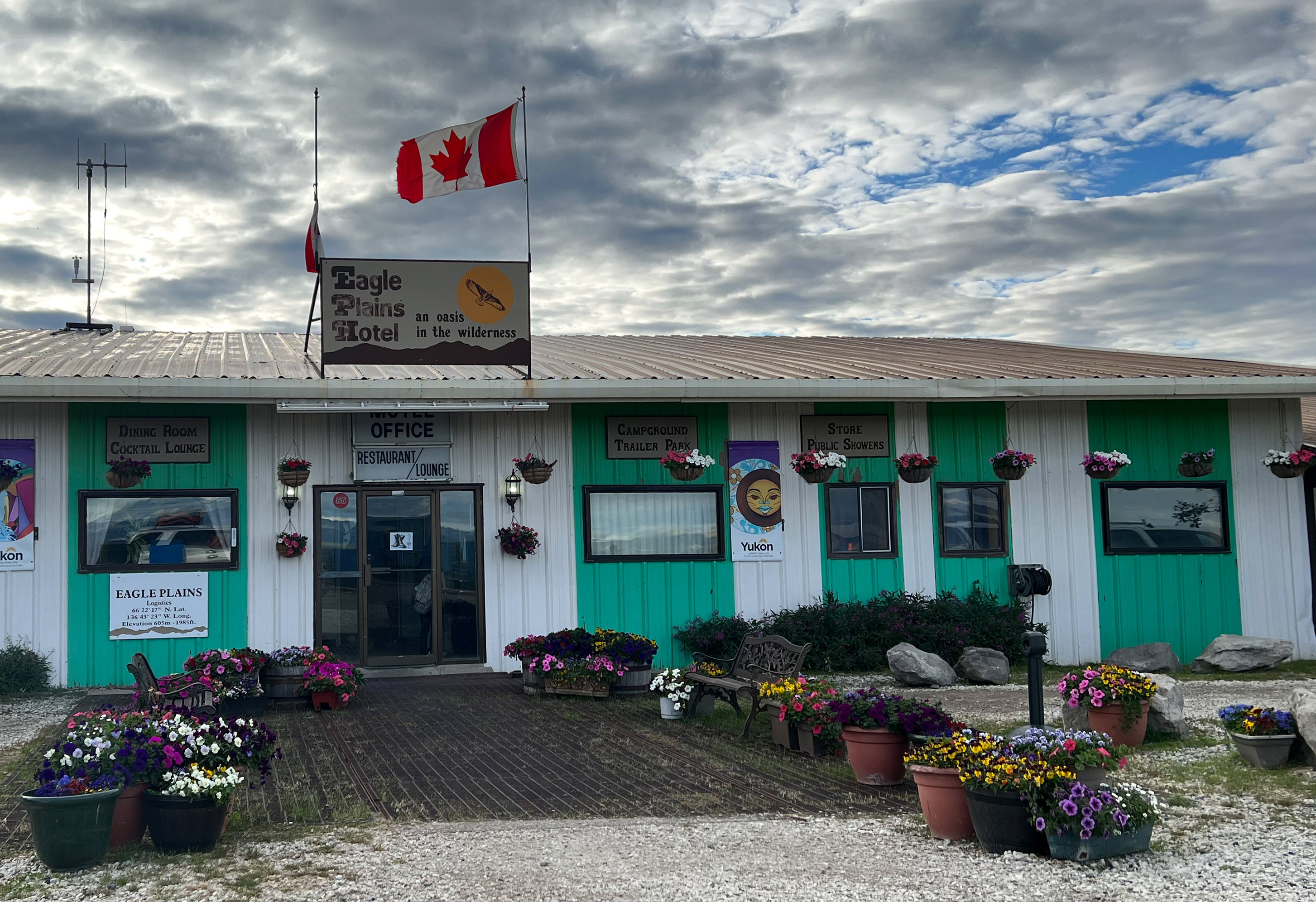
The Eagle Plains Hotel, the only lodging establishment along the Dempster Highway, in July 2022

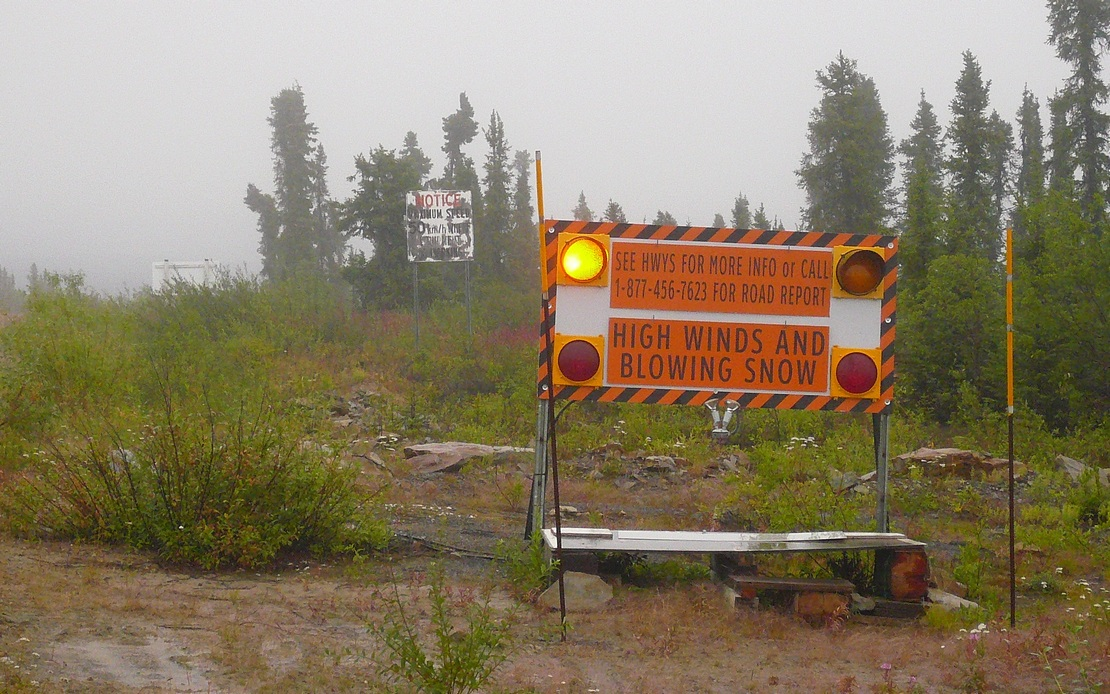
Sign in Eagle Plains: "High winds and blowing snow"

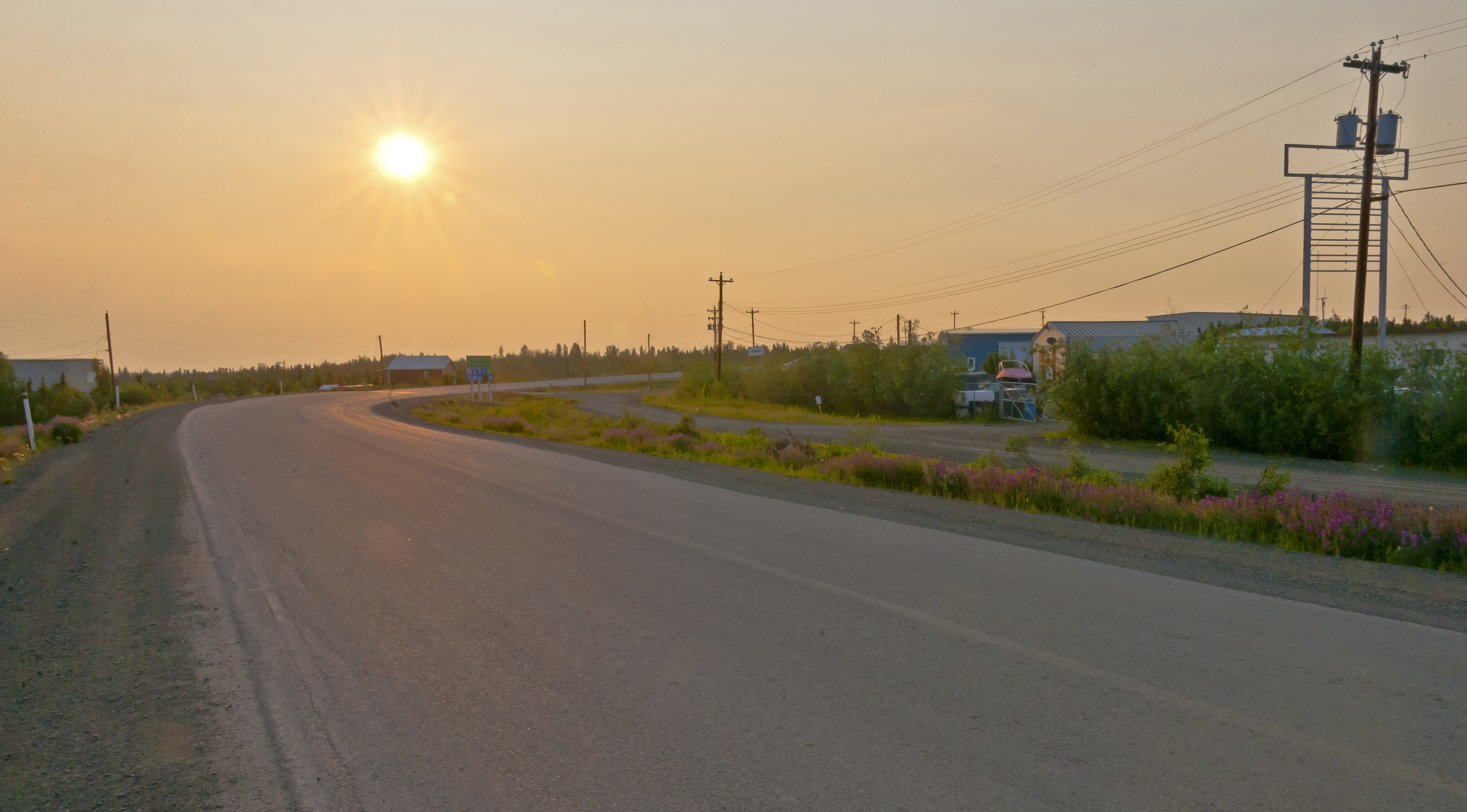
Midnight sun over the Dempster near Inuvik

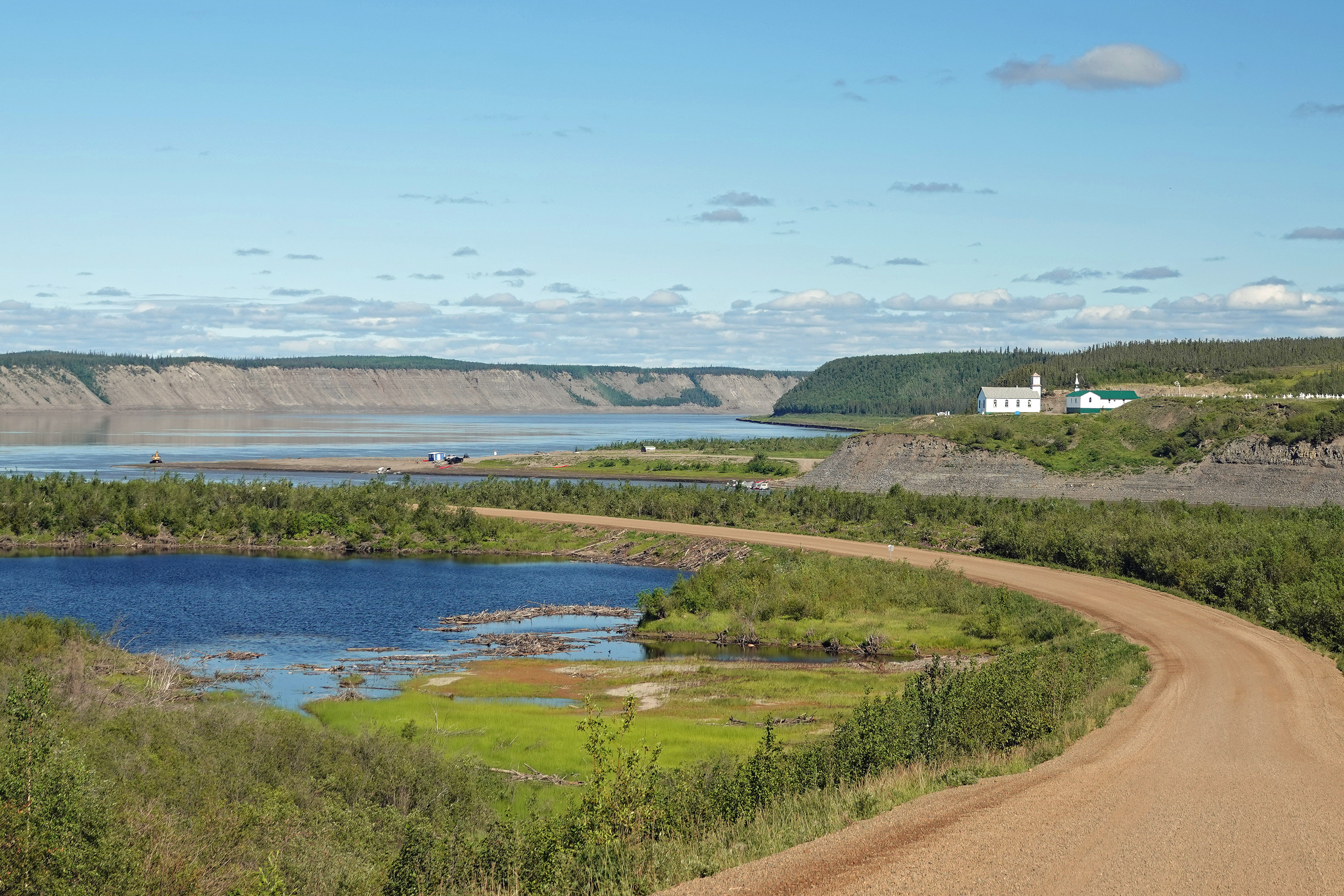
The Dempster Highway approaching the MacKenzie River ferry crossing, from the south, with buildings of Tsiigehtchic visible to the right

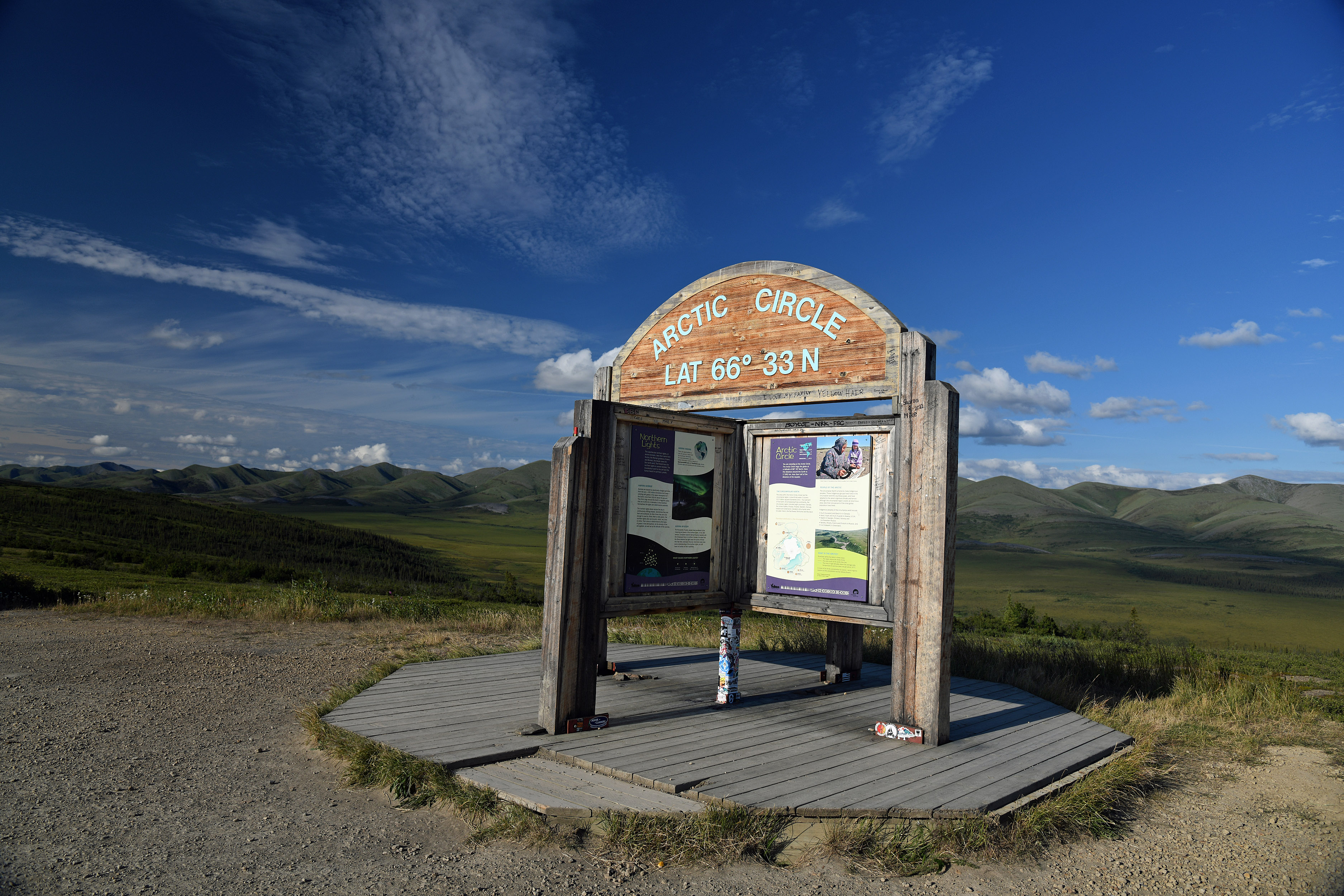
Pavilion marking where the Dempster Highway crosses the Arctic Circle

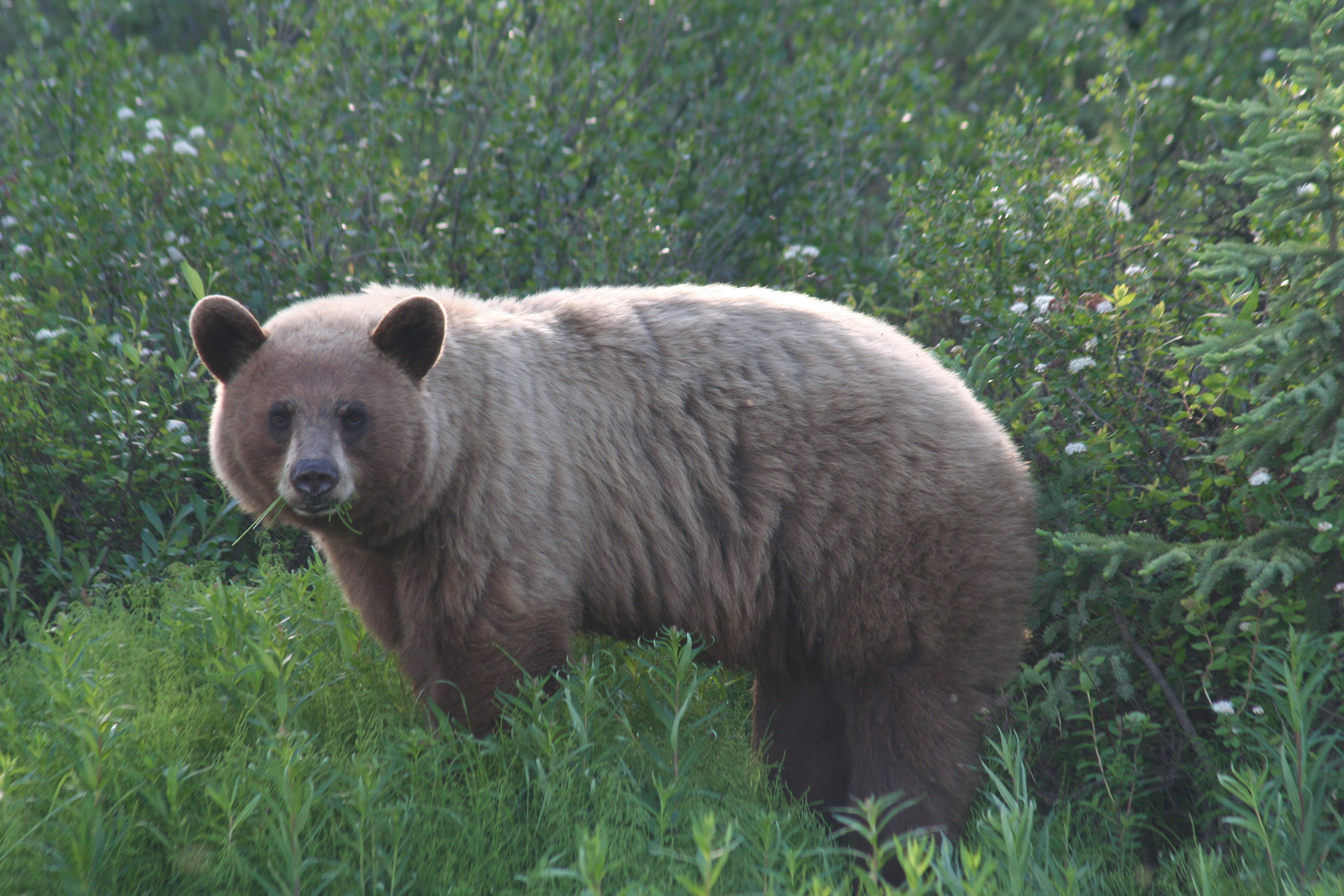
Black Bear along the Dempster Highway in 2006.

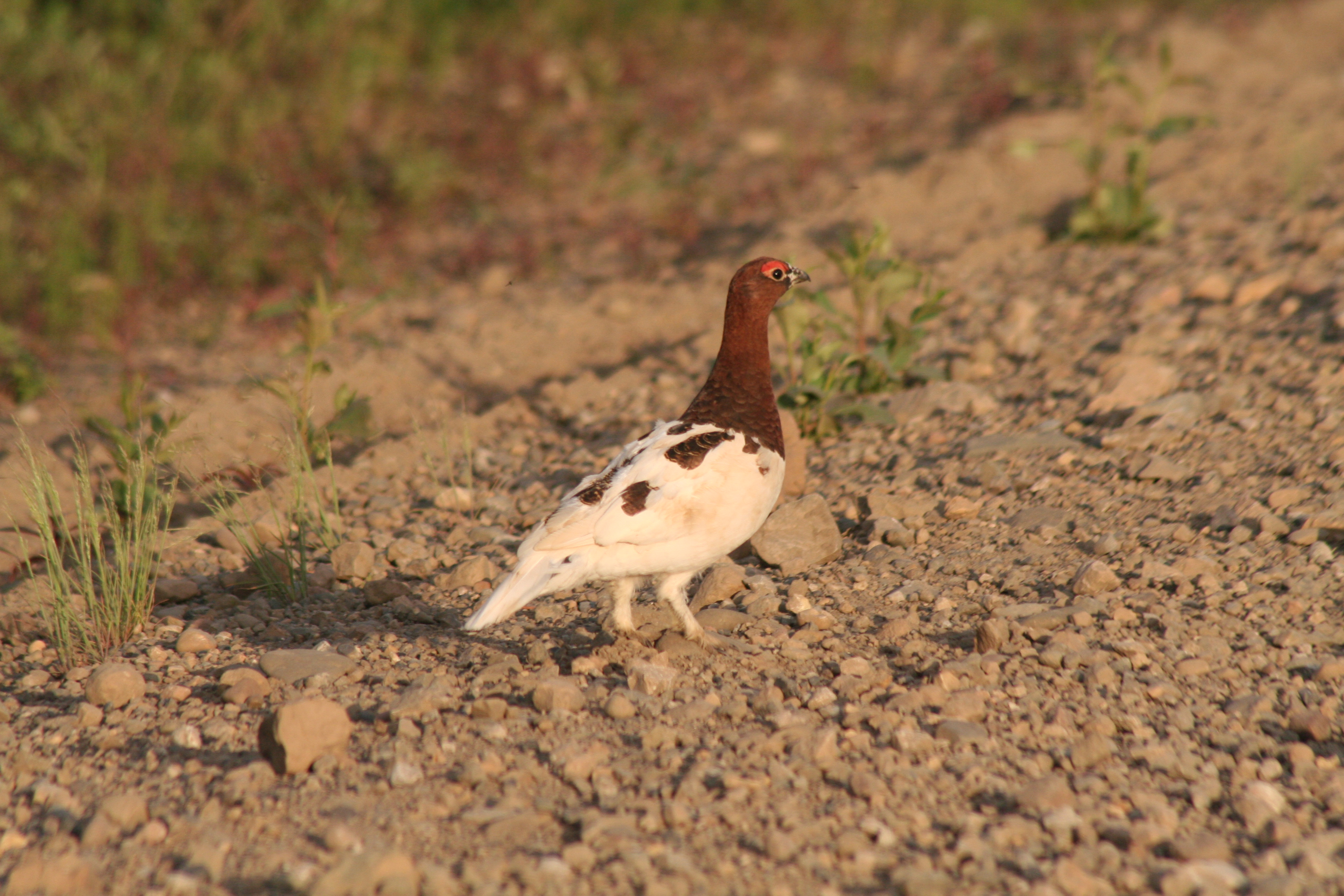
Ptarmigan on the Dempster Highway in 2006.

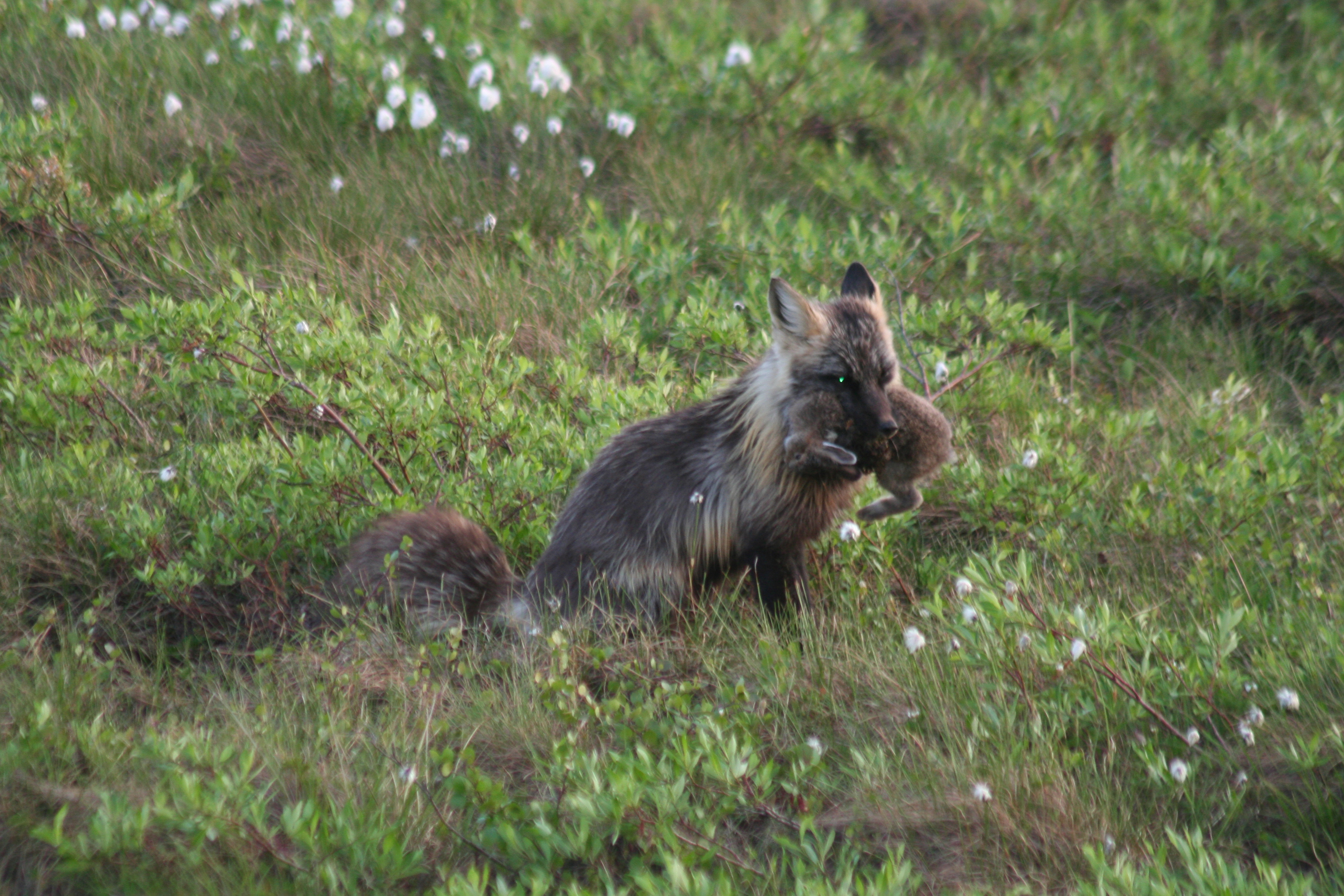
Silver red fox along the Dempster Highway in 2006.

== Major intersections ==
Territory	Region	Location	km	mi	Destinations	Notes
Yukon	unorganized		0	0.0	Hwy 2 (Klondike Highway) – Dawson City, Whitehorse	
Yukon	unorganized		82	51	North Fork Pass – 1,289 m (4,229 ft)	Highest point on the Dempster Highway
Yukon	unorganized	Eagle Plains	369	229		First available services
Yukon	unorganized		391	243	Wiley Aerodrome	Uses a portion of the highway as its runway.
Yukon	unorganized		405	252	Arctic Circle	
Yukon – Northwest Territories border			465	289	Hwy 5 northern terminus • Highway 8 southern terminus One hour time change (summer only)	
Northwest Territories	Inuvik		539	335	Crosses the Peel River; MV Abraham Francis (June to October) • Ice bridge (late November to April)	
Northwest Territories	Inuvik	Fort McPherson	550	340		Second and last available services
Northwest Territories	Inuvik	Tsiigehtchic	608	378	Crosses the Mackenzie River; MV Louis Cardinal (June to October) • Ice bridge (late November to April)	
Northwest Territories	Inuvik	Inuvik	736	457	Highway 10 north (Inuvik–Tuktoyaktuk Highway) – Tuktoyaktuk	
1.000 mi = 1.609 km; 1.000 km = 0.621 mi: Route transition

== See also ==
- List of Yukon territorial highways
- Dalton Highway – the only other all-season highway to cross the Arctic Circle in North America
