= Diane Archie =

Canadian politician

Member of the Legislative Assembly of the Northwest Territories
- In office October 1, 2019 – November 14, 2023
- Preceded by: Alfred Moses
- Succeeded by: Denny Rodgers
- Constituency: Inuvik Boot Lake

Member of the Executive Council of the Northwest Territories
- In office October 24, 2019 – November 14, 2023

Personal details
- Party: non-partisan consensus government

Diane Archie, formerly Diane Thom, is a Canadian politician in the Northwest Territories. She is a member of the Legislative Assembly of the Northwest Territories and the former Deputy Premier of the Northwest Territories.

== Career ==
Archie was first elected in the 2019 election. She represents the electoral district of Inuvik Boot Lake, and she was elected to territorial cabinet by her member colleagues on October 24, 2019. She was appointed Deputy Premier, as well as Minister of Health and Social Services, Minister Responsible for the Status of Women, and Minister Responsible for People with Disabilities.

== Election results ==
2023 Northwest Territories general election: Inuvik Boot Lake
Candidate	Votes	%
Denny Rodgers	210	42.51
Diane Archie (I.C.)	152	30.77
Sallie Ross	132	26.72
Total votes	494	

2019 Northwest Territories general election: Inuvik Boot Lake
Candidate	Votes
Diane Thom	239
Eugene Rees	179
Desmond Loreen	94
Jimmy Kalinek	47
