= Mackenzie Valley Fibre Link =

Canadian telecommunications project

Mackenzie Valley Fibre Link (MVFL) is a project in Inuvik, Northwest Territories commissioned by the Government of Northwest Territories and built by Northern Lights, a consortium of Ledcor Developments Ltd., including Ledcor Technical Services, subsidiaries of Ledcor Group of Companies, and Northwestel. MVFL will provide high speed telecommunications to over 10 communities in the region. The route extends from McGill Lake in southern NWT, 90 km south of Fort Simpson, to Tukoyaktuk on the shores of the Arctic Ocean, a distance of approximately 1,270 km.

== In-depth ==
The system will be installed in two phases: McGill Lake to Inuvik with a planned completion of mid-2016, and an extension to Tuktoyaktuk following the completion of the all-weather highway extension from Inuvik. Seven communities will be served directly by the MVFL, with possible future access to an additional five communities in the region using microwave systems to connect with the MVFL system. Construction of the MVFL will support the further expansion of the Inuvik Satellite Station Facility by its international partners, allowing the facility to track and receive real-time data from polar-orbiting satellites for scientific, mapping, weather surveillance and other purposes. The purpose of the project is to provide new opportunities for business, more efficient and effective delivery of government programs and services such as healthcare and education, including in the e-commerce and high-tech sectors, and allow for the expansion of the Inuvik Satellite Station Facility which provides remote sensing for international clients. The fibre link will act as an alternative network path for communication services in the case of accidental fibre cuts.

Northwestel currently delivers internet to customers along the valley via microwave towers, a slower, less powerful type of internet delivery system than fibre. The government expects the fibre link to improve the quality of web-delivered services in the region, including telehealth and distance education.

MVFL will provide a fibre link between the satellite receiving station in Inuvik and southern Canadian networks, enabling space agencies worldwide to have high speed access to the Inuvik facility.

== History ==
On July 30, 2014, Northwest Territories Finance Minister J. Michael Miltenberger selected Northern Lights Fibre Consortium to design, build, finance and operate the Mackenzie Valley Fibre Link. In the following months, the Government of Northwest Territories and Northern lights completed surveying, geotechnical and other early planning activities in preparation for the design and installation of the fibre link. Environmental requirements will also be closely monitored.

On October 14, 2014, the Government of Northwest Territories and the K’ahsho Got’ine District have signed an agreement to allow for the construction and operation of the project.

On November 3, 2014, the Government of Northwest Territories and Northern Lights General Partnership has signed a contract to design, build, finance, operate and maintain the Mackenzie Valley Fibre Link and includes ongoing operation of the system for a period of 20 years.
