= CFS Inuvik =

- Location within Northwest Territories
- Coordinates: 68°24′52″N 133°46′12″W
- Country: Canada
- Territory: Northwest Territories
- Time zone: UTC−06:00 (Northwest Territories Time)

Canadian Forces Station Inuvik was a signals intercept facility located near Inuvik, Northwest Territories.

The site started as NRS Inuvik (1961), was commissioned HMCS INUVIK (1963), and with armed forces unification became CFS Inuvik (1966). Its callsign was CFV.

A Pusher CDAA antenna array was used for HFDF operations.

The station closed in 1986.
