= Richardson Mountains =

Mountain range in northern Yukon, Canada

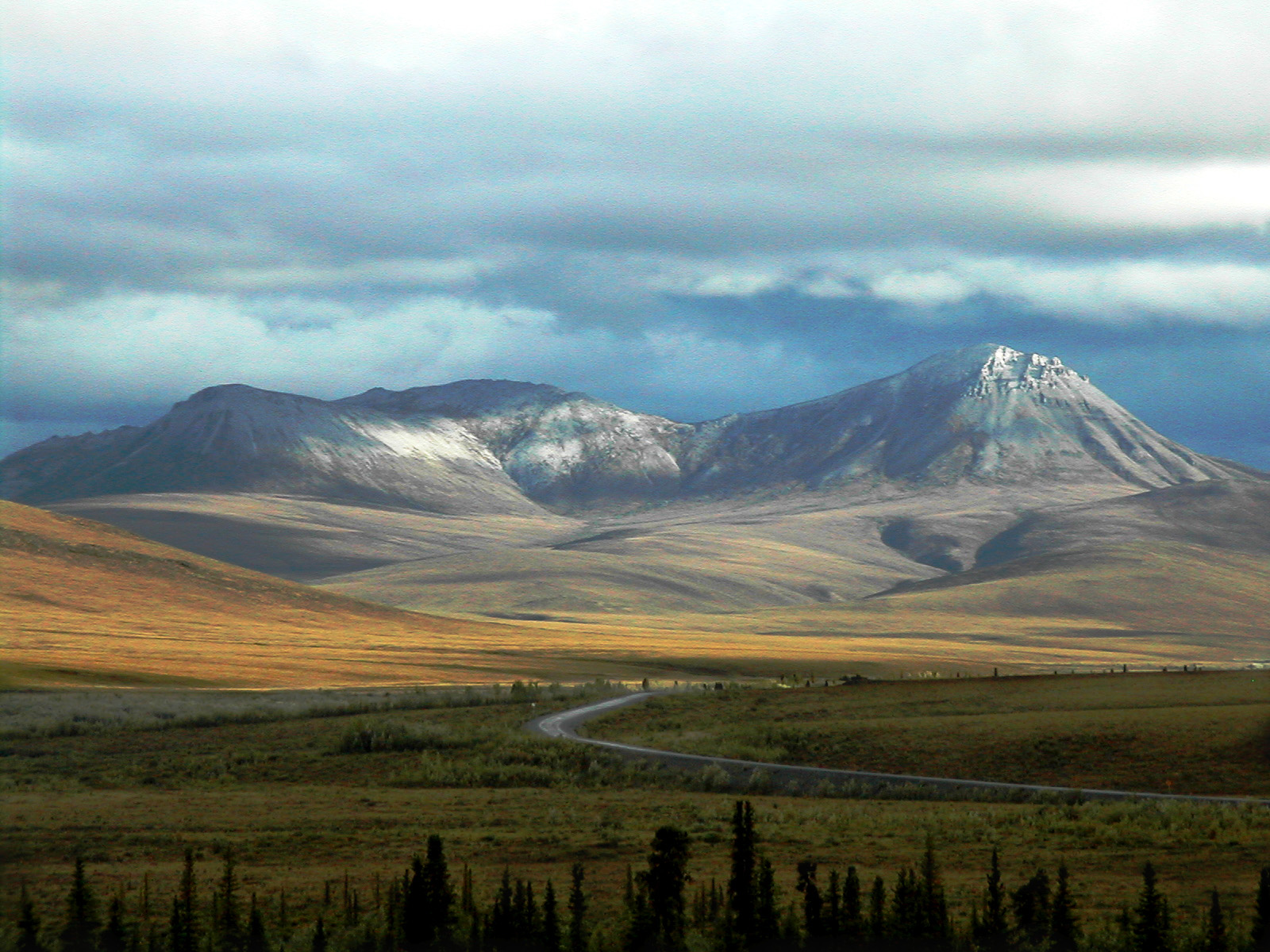
- Dempster Highway crossing the Richardson Mountains

Highest point
- Peak: Manuel Peak
- Elevation: 1,722 m (5,650 ft)
- Prominence: 1,292 m (4,239 ft)
- Coordinates: 67°59′36″N 136°35′07″W

Naming
- Etymology: Named for Arctic explorer John Richardson

Geography
- Location within Northwest Territories
- Country: Canada
- Territories: Northwest Territories, Yukon
- Range coordinates: 68°19′59″N 135°45′09″W
- Parent range: Brooks Range
- Topo map: NTS 106L05

The Richardson Mountains are a mountain range located west of the mouth of the Mackenzie River in northern Yukon, Canada. They parallel the northernmost part of the boundary between Yukon and Northwest Territories.

Although some sources consider the Richardson Mountains to be part of the Canadian Rockies, the common northern limit of the Canadian Rockies is the Liard River, which is a long way south. The Richardson Mountains are a sub-range of the Brooks Range which lies mostly in Alaska.

== Geology ==
Richardson Mountains is in continuous permafrost region. Many areas are experiencing retrogressive thaw slump.

This region contains well-exposed sedimentary rocks of Proterozoic to Cretaceous age and small Devonian granite intrusions. Late Cretaceous to Tertiary compression inverted the original extensional structures, forming the Richardson Anticlinorium. This north-plunging structure is approximately 75 km wide and exposes rocks ranging from the Proterozoic to Carboniferous.

== See also ==
- List of mountain ranges of Canada
- Albert Johnson (criminal)
