= Inuvik =

Arctic town in the Northwest Territories, Canada

Inuvik Inuuvik
- Town
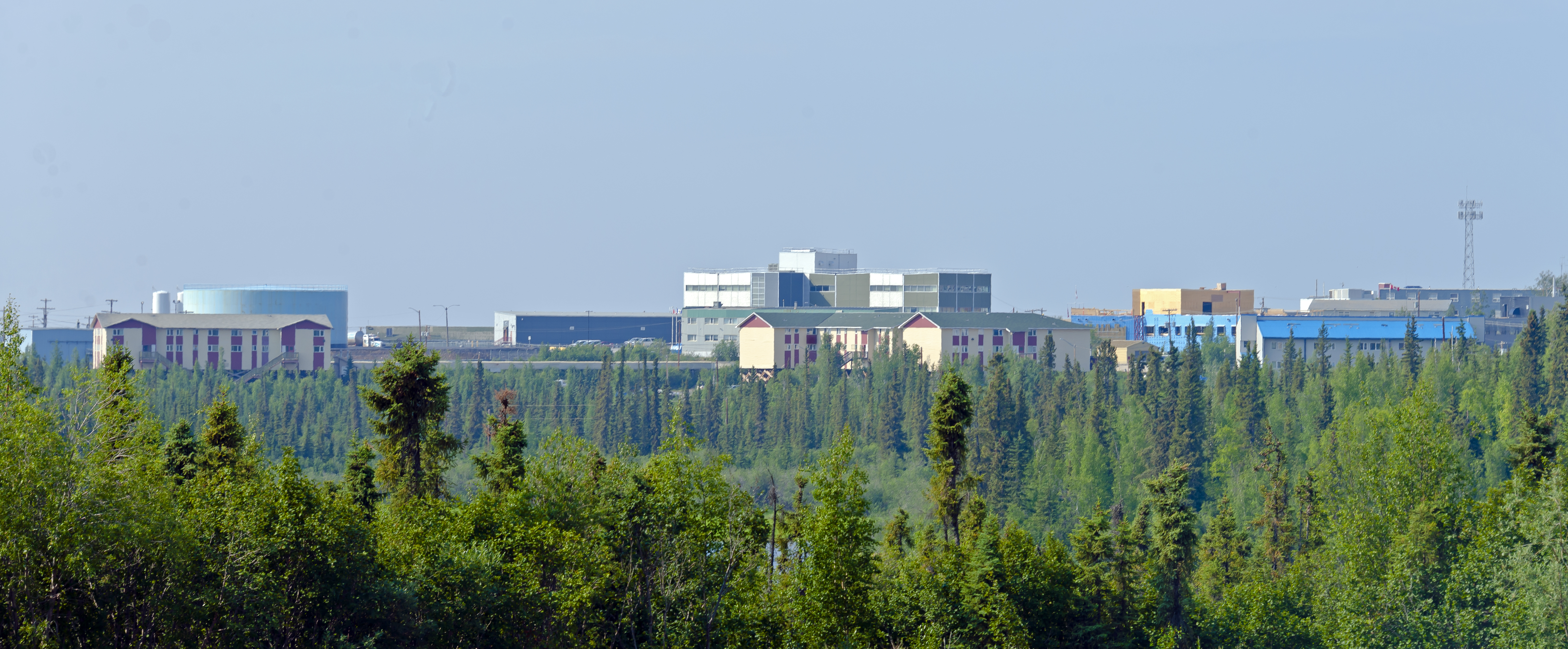
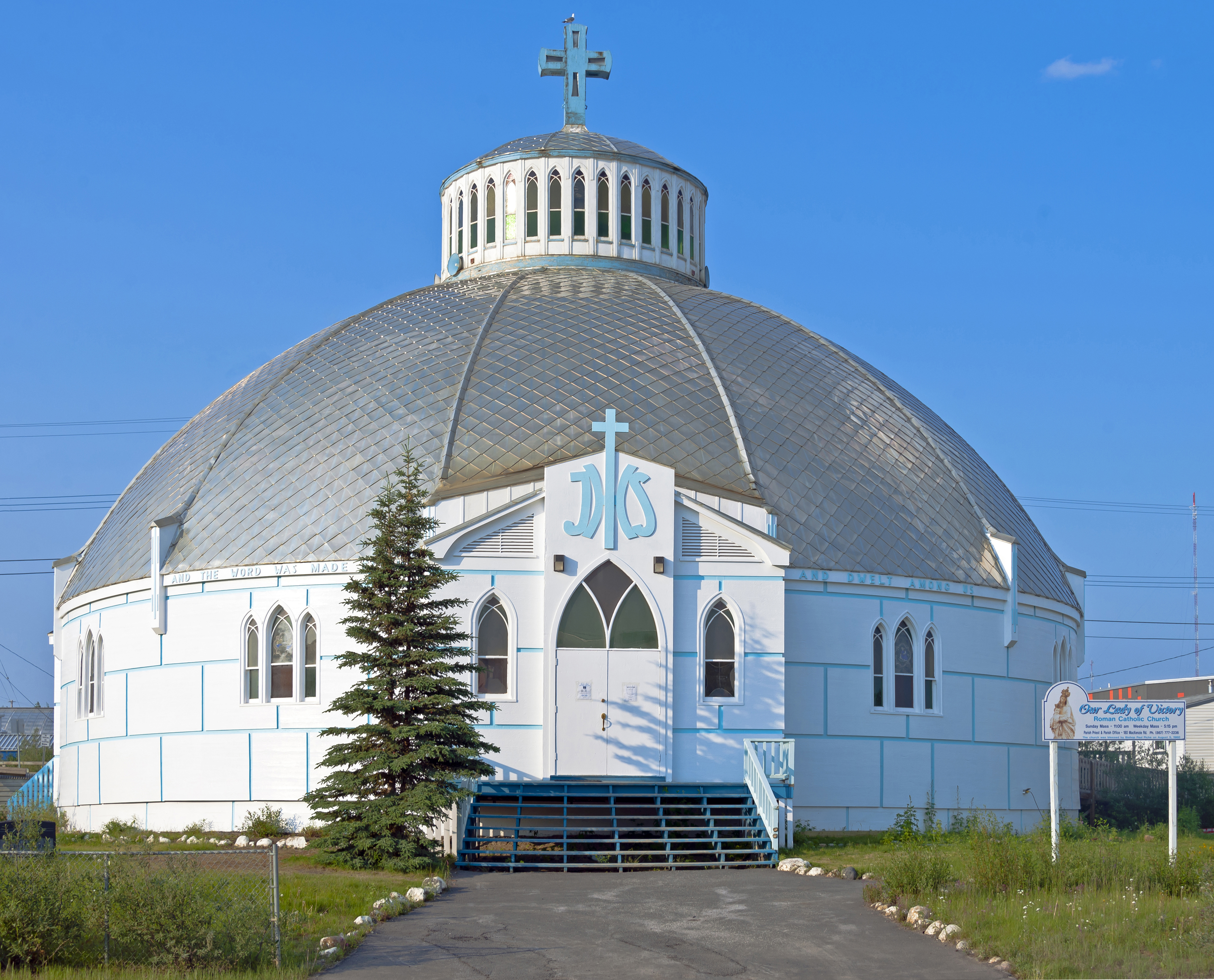
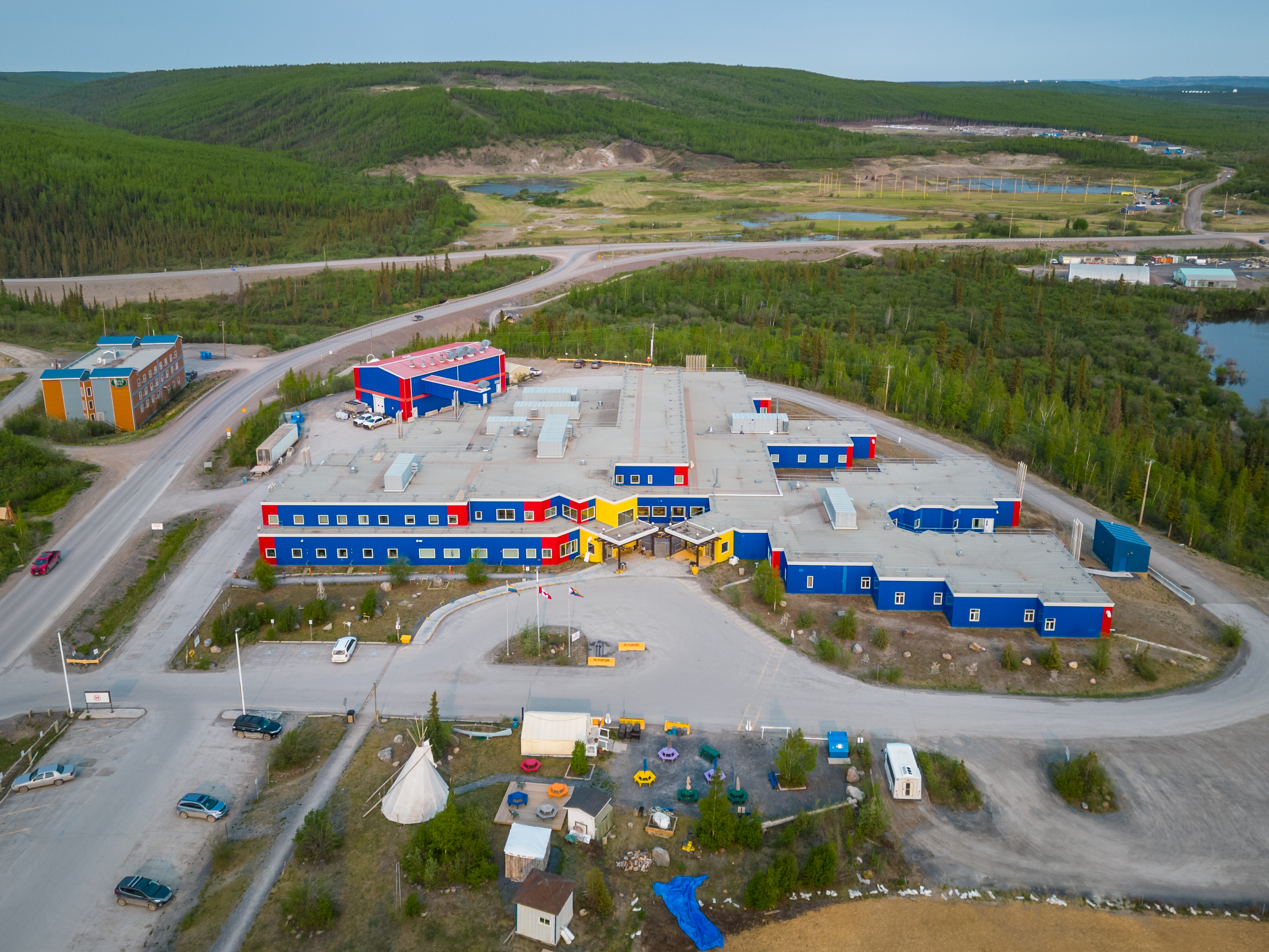
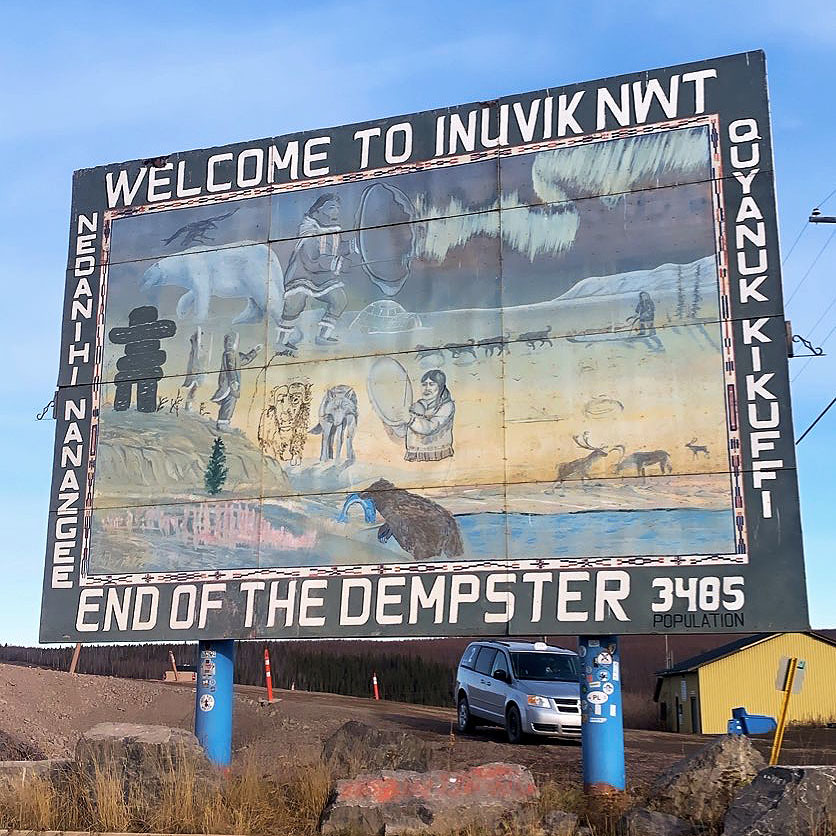
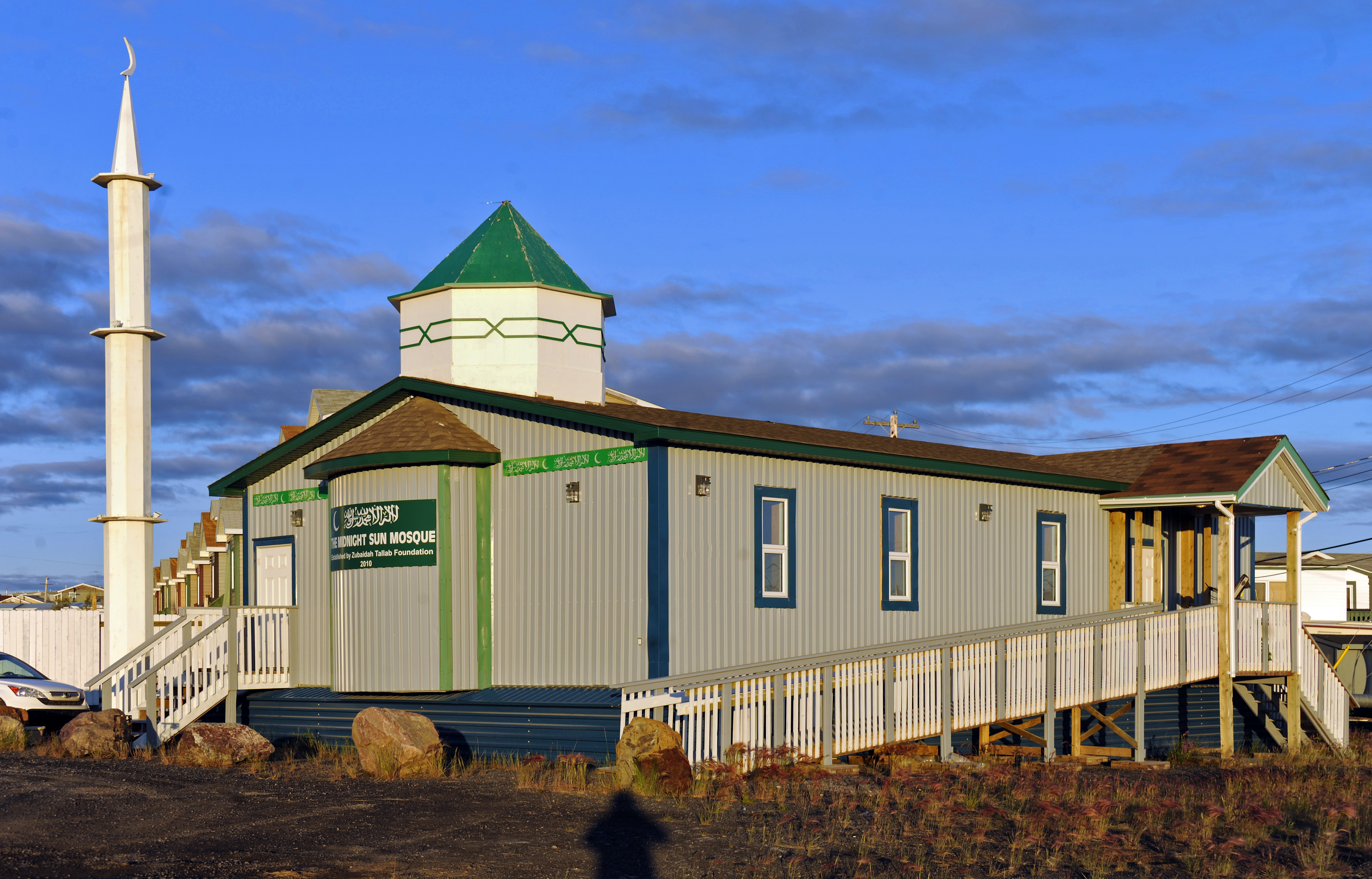
- Downtown Inuvik Our Lady of Victory Inuvik Regional Hospital Welcome sign Midnight Sun Mosque

- Location within Northwest Territories Location within Canada
- Coordinates: 68°21′39″N 133°43′47″W
- Country: Canada
- Territory: Northwest Territories
- Region: Inuvik Region
- Constituency: Inuvik Boot Lake; Inuvik Twin Lakes
- Census division: Region 1
- Surveyed: 1954
- Official start: 18 July 1958
- Village: 1 April 1967
- Town: January 1970
- Incorporation: 1 January 1979

Government
  - Mayor: Clarence Wood
  - SAO: Grant Hood
  - MLA: Lesa Semmler (Twin Lakes)
  - MLA: Denny Rodgers (Boot Lake)
  - MP: Rebecca Alty

Area
  - Land: 62.68 km^{2} (24.20 sq mi)
  - Population centre: 1.60 km^{2} (0.62 sq mi)
- Elevation: 15 m (49 ft)
- Highest elevation: 68 m (223 ft)
- Lowest elevation: 10 m (33 ft)

Population (2021)
  - Total: 3,137
  - Density: 50/km^{2} (130/sq mi)
  - Population centre: 3,001
  - Population centre density: 1,871.4/km^{2} (4,847/sq mi)
- Time zone: UTC−06:00 (Northwest Territories Time)
- Canadian Postal code: X0E 0T0
- Area code: 867
- Telephone exchange: 620, 678, 768, 777 [777 was previously (403) 979], 888
  - Living cost (2018): 147.5^{A}
  - Food price index (2019): 158.6^{B}
- Highways: Dempster Highway; Inuvik–Tuktoyaktuk Highway
- Waterways: Mackenzie River
- Climate: Dfc
- Website: inuvik.ca
- Sources: Department of Municipal and Community Affairs, Prince of Wales Northern Heritage Centre, Canada Flight Supplement^A2018 figure based on Edmonton = 100^B2019 figure based on Yellowknife = 100

Inuvik (Note: /ɪˈnuːvɪk/ ih-NOO-vik; Inuinnaqtun: Inuuvik, 'living place') is the only town in the Inuvik Region, and the third largest community in Canada's Northwest Territories. Located in the Beaufort Delta Region, it serves as the region's administrative and service centre. Inuvik is home to federal, territorial, and Indigenous government offices, along with a regional hospital and airport.

Inuvik is located on the northern edge of a boreal forest just before it begins to transition to tundra. It is on the east side of the enormous Mackenzie River delta. The town lies within the Gwich'in Settlement Region and the Inuvialuit Settlement Region.

== History ==
Inuvik was conceived in 1953 as a replacement administrative centre for the hamlet of Aklavik on the west of the Mackenzie Delta, as the latter was prone to flooding and had no room for expansion. Initially called "New Aklavik", it was renamed Inuvik (from Inuuvik, Inuvialuktun for "living place") in 1958. The school was built in 1959 and the hospital, government offices and staff residences in 1960, when people, including Inuvialuit, Gwichʼin (Dene) and Métis, began to live in the community.

A Naval Radio Station, later Canadian Forces Station Inuvik was commissioned on 10 September 1963 after operations had been successfully transferred from NRS Aklavik. As a Canadian Forces Station, it was a communications research/signals intercept facility and part of the SUPRAD (Supplementary Radio) network.

Inuvik achieved village status in 1967 and became a full town in 1979 with an elected mayor and council. In 1979, with the completion of the Dempster Highway, Inuvik became connected to Canada's highway system, and simultaneously the most northerly town to which one could drive in Canada.

For decades, the town's economy was supported by CFS Inuvik and by petrochemical companies exploring the Mackenzie Valley and the Beaufort Sea for petroleum. CFS Inuvik closed on 1 April 1986 and the site was transferred to the Department of Transport for use as a telecommunications station. Nothing remains of CFS Inuvik today. The Navy Operations base at the end of Navy Road was completely dismantled and removed. In the early 1990s, local resistance to petroleum exploration and low international oil prices meant the petrochemical industry also moved away. Thereafter, the economy has been based on some minor tourism, along with subsidies provided by the Crown–Indigenous Relations and Northern Affairs Canada (INAC), Health Canada (for the regional hospital) and the Royal Canadian Mounted Police.

While a winter only ice road through the Mackenzie River delta still connects Inuvik to Aklavik (southwest of Inuvik), the Tuktoyaktuk Winter Road, which ran northeast to Tuktoyaktuk, has not been maintained since the opening of the year-round Inuvik–Tuktoyaktuk Highway (ITH) in November 2017. The Inuvik to Tuktoyaktuk highway, which connects to Canada's highway system at Inuvik via the Dempster Highway, is the first road in history to reach the Arctic Ocean in North America.

On 6 March 2025, Bill Blair, the Minister of National Defence, announced that Inuvik will be one of three designated Northern Operational Support Hubs, alongside Yellowknife and Iqaluit, to support the Canadian Armed Forces operations in the Arctic.

== Demographics ==
Federal census population history of Inuvik
Year	Pop.	±%
1961	1,248	—
1966	2,040	+63.5%
1971	2,669	+30.8%
1976	3,116	+16.7%
1981	3,147	+1.0%
1986	3,389	+7.7%
1991	3,206	−5.4%
1996	3,296	+2.8%
2001	3,152	−4.4%
2006	3,484	+10.5%
2011	3,463	−0.6%
2016	3,243	−6.4%
2021	3,137	−3.3%
Source: Statistics Canada

Annual population estimates

Year	Pop.	±%
1996	3,461	—
1997	3,361	−2.9%
1998	3,313	−1.4%
1999	3,317	+0.1%
2000	3,324	+0.2%
2001	3,399	+2.3%
2002	3,555	+4.6%
2003	3,572	+0.5%
2004	3,622	+1.4%
2005	3,654	+0.9%
2006	3,646	−0.2%
2007	3,616	−0.8%
2008	3,601	−0.4%

Year	Pop.	±%
2009	3,632	+0.9%
2010	3,639	+0.2%
2011	3,607	−0.9%
2012	3,559	−1.3%
2013	3,457	−2.9%
2014	3,368	−2.6%
2015	3,266	−3.0%
2016	3,239	−0.8%
2017	3,192	−1.5%
2018	3,424	+7.3%
2019	3,370	−1.6%
2020	3,366	−0.1%

Sources: NWT Bureau of Statistics (2008–2019), NWT Bureau of Statistics (2001–2017)

In the 2021 Canadian census conducted by Statistics Canada, Inuvik had a population of 3,137 living in 1,223 of its 1,464 total private dwellings, a change of −3.3 per cent from its 2016 population of 3,243. With a land area of 62.68 km^{2} (24.20 sq mi), it had a population density of 50.0/km^{2} in 2021.

=== Ethnicity ===
As of the 2021 Canadian census there were 1,990 people who identified as Indigenous. Of these 63.6 per cent were Inuvialuit (Inuit, predominantly Uummarmiut), 26.1 per cent First Nations, 5.8 per cent Métis and 4.8 per cent reported other Indigenous heritage. The non-Indigenous population of Inuvik was 36.6 per cent. Inuvik is home to a diverse immigrant population, making it one of the most cosmopolitan towns in Northern Canada. Local Gwichʼin are enrolled in the Inuvik Native Band.

Panethnic groups in the Town of Inuvik (2001−2021)
Panethnic group	2021		2016		2011		2006		2001	
Panethnic group	Pop.	%	Pop.	%	Pop.	%	Pop.	%	Pop.	%
Indigenous	1,990	65.14%	2,080	66.56%	2,485	67.99%	2,175	63.41%	1,690	59.19%
European (Note: Statistic includes all persons that did not make up part of a visible minority or an indigenous identity.)	765	25.04%	820	26.24%	1,015	27.77%	1,140	33.24%	1,085	38%
Southeast Asian (Note: Statistic includes total responses of "Filipino" and "Southeast Asian" under visible minority section on census.)	115	3.76%	75	2.4%	45	1.23%	10	0.29%	15	0.53%
African	80	2.62%	35	1.12%	45	1.23%	35	1.02%	15	0.53%
South Asian	55	1.8%	50	1.6%	15	0.41%	25	0.73%	15	0.53%
Middle Eastern (Note: Statistic includes total responses of "West Asian" and "Arab" under visible minority section on census.)	25	0.82%	35	1.12%	35	0.96%	25	0.73%	30	1.05%
East Asian (Note: Statistic includes total responses of "Chinese", "Korean", and "Japanese" under visible minority section on census.)	20	0.65%	20	0.64%	10	0.27%	10	0.29%	0	0%
Latin American	10	0.33%	10	0.32%	10	0.27%	10	0.29%	10	0.35%
Other / multiracial (Note: Statistic includes total responses of "Visible minority, n.i.e." and "Multiple visible minorities" under visible minority section on census.)	30	0.98%	0	0%	0	0%	0	0%	10	0.35%
Total responses	3,055	97.39%	3,125	96.36%	3,655	105.54%	3,430	98.45%	2,855	98.65%
Total population	3,137	100%	3,243	100%	3,463	100%	3,484	100%	2,894	100%
Note: Totals greater than 100% due to multiple origin responses

=== Language ===
The main language spoken in Inuvik is English, though schools teach and a handful of local people still speak Inuinnaqtun (Inuvialuktun), and Gwichʼin. Local CBC Radio, CHAK (AM), broadcasts an hour of programming a day in each of these languages.

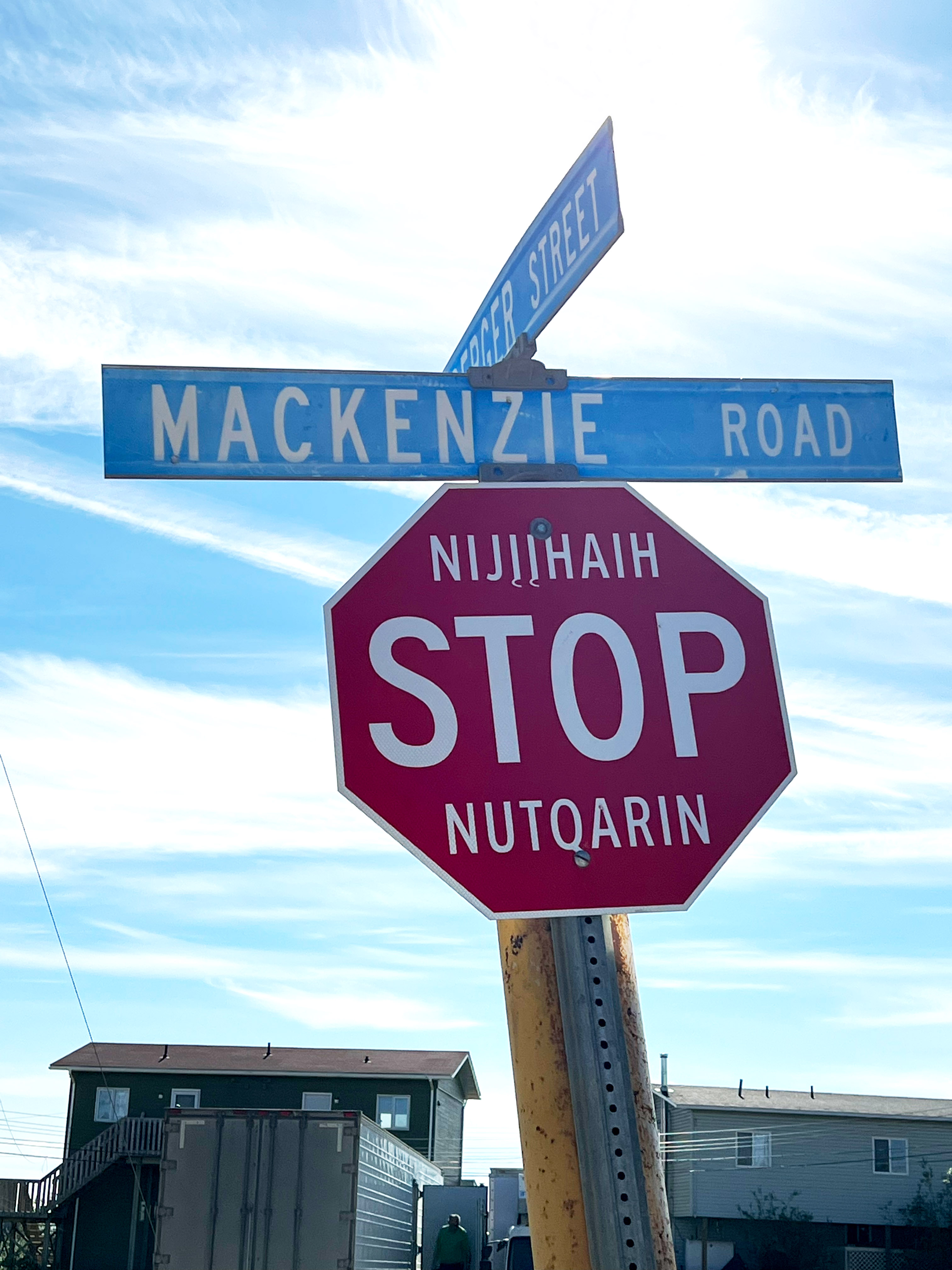
Trilingual Stop sign in Inuvik, July 2022

=== Religion ===
There are also about 100 Muslims, most of whom came there for economic opportunities. A small mosque (dubbed "Little mosque on the tundra" in reference to the CBC show Little Mosque on the Prairie) was established in 2010.

== Geography ==
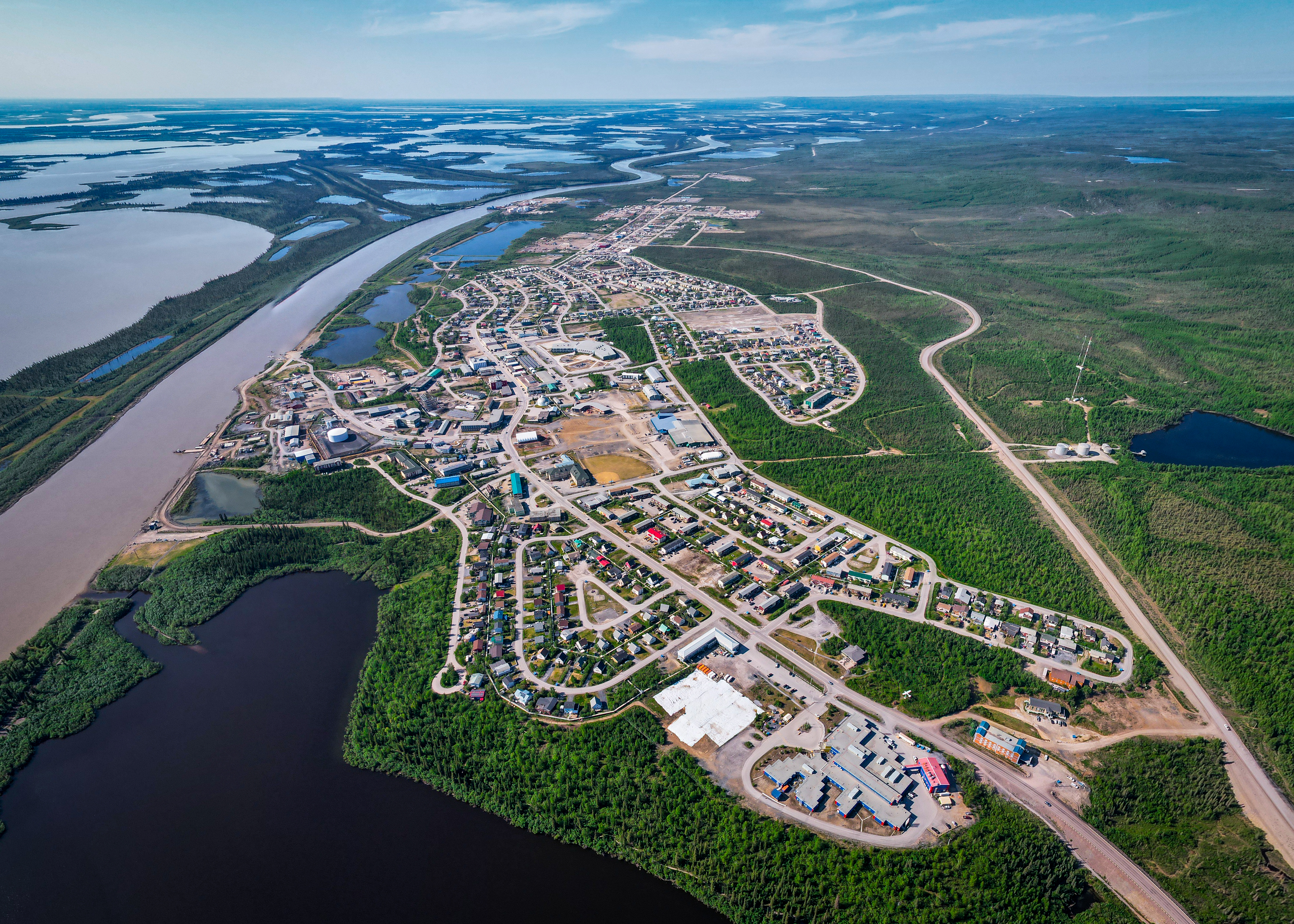
Aerial view of town in 2021

Inuvik is located on the East Channel of the Mackenzie Delta, approximately 100 km (62 mi) from the Arctic Ocean and approximately 200 km (120 mi) north of the Arctic Circle. The tree line lies north of Inuvik, and the town is surrounded by boreal forest.

Due to its northern location, Inuvik experiences an average of 56 days of midnight sun every summer and 30 days of polar night every winter.

== Transportation ==
=== Road ===
Until November 2017, Inuvik was the most northern community in Canada to be accessible by road (now second to Tuktoyaktuk). The 736 km (457 mi) Dempster Highway links Inuvik to the rest of Canada, providing relatively easy access to a wide variety of goods, and greatly reducing their cost. In contrast, many Arctic communities depend on cargo flights for regular goods and summer sealifts for larger freight, making goods expensive and often slow to arrive. In 2017, the Inuvik–Tuktoyaktuk Highway was extended north from Inuvik another 138 km (86 mi) to Tuktoyaktuk on the Arctic coast. Inuvik is also connected to Aklavik by an ice road across the Mackenzie Delta from late December until late April each year.

The Dempster Highway relies on ferries to cross the Peel River near Fort McPherson and the Mackenzie River at Tsiigehtchic during the summer. In winter, ice bridges are constructed to cross the rivers. During the spring the crossings close throughout May as the ice on the rivers breaks up. Similarly, they are impassible for most of November while the rivers freeze. During these times air travel is the only way for people and goods to reach Inuvik.

=== Air ===
A 1953 Cessna 180 mounted as a weather vane outside the visitor centre

The Inuvik (Mike Zubko) Airport is serviced by several regional carriers. The airport is undergoing renovations as part of expansion plans and is scheduled to be completed by 2028. Canadian North has regular direct flights to Yellowknife and Norman Wells. It further connects to Edmonton, and a number of smaller communities in the Northwest Territories and Nunavut. Air North connects to points in the Yukon and travels as far south as Vancouver. Aklak Air flies north to the small communities of Sachs Harbour, Paulatuk, and Ulukhaktok. Freight services, helicopters, and floatplane charters are also available from Inuvik. Floatplane service operates out of the nearby Inuvik/Shell Lake Water Aerodrome. North-Wright Airways provides services between Aklavik and Inuvik.

=== Water ===
When the Mackenzie River is ice-free, Marine Transportation Services provides a commercial barge service from Hay River, on Great Slave Lake to the regional terminal in Inuvik. The annual sealift moves supplies east into the Kitikmeot Region of Nunavut and west to Utqiagvik, Alaska. Many locals own small boats with outboard motors which are used to access family hunting and fishing camps or to visit Aklavik. Boat traffic comes to a halt in the winter when the Mackenzie River freezes.

== Climate ==
Inuvik has a subarctic climate (Köppen Dfc, Trewartha Eclc/Ecld). Summers are typically wetter and cool, with temperatures varying wildly throughout the months due to its peculiar location near the cold Arctic Ocean. The average hottest month of the year, July, has a mean high of 19.5 °C (67.1 °F) and mean low of 8.6 °C (47.5 °F). Unlike many other North American continental climates, Inuvik warms up very quickly during May and June due to the rapidly increasing day length, and that remaining snow cools down until May. June is a warmer month than August.

Seasonal transitions are extremely short, with mean daily temperatures rising or falling as fast as 0.5 °C (0.90 °F) per day. Winters are long and severe; the coldest month of the year, January, having a mean high of −22.8 °C (−9.0 °F) and a mean low of −31.0 °C (−23.8 °F). Freezing temperatures can occur any month of the year. Inuvik has a great variation of temperatures during the year, usually peaking below −40 °C (−40 °F) in the winter and above 30 °C (86 °F) in the summer. The highest temperature ever recorded in Inuvik was 34.8 °C (94.6 °F) on 7 August 2024. The coldest temperature ever recorded was −56.7 °C (−70.1 °F) on 4 February 1968.

Snow that falls from October onward usually stays until the spring thaw in mid-May but can sometimes last until June.

Climate data for Inuvik (Inuvik (Mike Zubko) Airport) Climate ID: 2202570; coordinates 68°18′15″N 133°28′58″W; elevation: 67.7 m (222 ft); 1991–2020 normals, extremes 1957–present (Note: Includes composite data from Inuvik A: Climate ID: 2202571; coordinates 68°18′14″N 133°28′59″W; elevation: 67.7 m (222 ft) and Inuvik Climate / Inuvik UA; WMO ID: 71364 / 71957; 68°19′N 133°31′W; elevation: 103.0 m (337.9 ft) / 103.2 m (339 ft). Sunshine from 1951–1980)
Month	Jan	Feb	Mar	Apr	May	Jun	Jul	Aug	Sep	Oct	Nov	Dec	Year
Record high humidex	5.9	4.9	8.4	14.9	29.2	35.8	40.0	36.6	26.7	20.6	10.0	5.0	40.0
Record high °C (°F)	7.1 (44.8)	5.2 (41.4)	8.7 (47.7)	15.3 (59.5)	30.1 (86.2)	32.8 (91.0)	33.0 (91.4)	34.8 (94.6)	26.7 (80.1)	20.9 (69.6)	10.6 (51.1)	5.0 (41.0)	34.8 (94.6)
Mean daily maximum °C (°F)	−21.4 (−6.5)	−19.5 (−3.1)	−16.3 (2.7)	−5.6 (21.9)	6.3 (43.3)	17.5 (63.5)	19.3 (66.7)	15.4 (59.7)	7.9 (46.2)	−3.0 (26.6)	−14.3 (6.3)	−19.7 (−3.5)	−2.8 (27.0)
Daily mean °C (°F)	−24.9 (−12.8)	−23.5 (−10.3)	−21.1 (−6.0)	−10.6 (12.9)	1.5 (34.7)	11.6 (52.9)	14.2 (57.6)	10.9 (51.6)	4.4 (39.9)	−5.9 (21.4)	−17.6 (0.3)	−23.0 (−9.4)	−7.0 (19.4)
Mean daily minimum °C (°F)	−28.4 (−19.1)	−27.3 (−17.1)	−25.8 (−14.4)	−15.5 (4.1)	−3.3 (26.1)	5.7 (42.3)	9.0 (48.2)	6.4 (43.5)	0.8 (33.4)	−8.6 (16.5)	−20.8 (−5.4)	−26.4 (−15.5)	−11.2 (11.8)
Record low °C (°F)	−54.4 (−65.9)	−56.7 (−70.1)	−50.6 (−59.1)	−46.1 (−51.0)	−27.8 (−18.0)	−6.1 (21.0)	−3.3 (26.1)	−6.1 (21.0)	−20.1 (−4.2)	−35.0 (−31.0)	−46.1 (−51.0)	−50.0 (−58.0)	−56.7 (−70.1)
Record low wind chill	−64.1	−67.0	−59.6	−51.1	−35.2	−13.3	−5.2	−9.2	−23.4	−43.1	−55.0	−59.6	−67.0
Average precipitation mm (inches)	13.4 (0.53)	10.8 (0.43)	13.6 (0.54)	9.9 (0.39)	13.7 (0.54)	23.5 (0.93)	40.1 (1.58)	42.4 (1.67)	32.5 (1.28)	23.0 (0.91)	15.2 (0.60)	11.7 (0.46)	249.8 (9.83)
Average rainfall mm (inches)	—	0.0 (0.0)	0.0 (0.0)	0.3 (0.01)	6.0 (0.24)	—	31.8 (1.25)	36.0 (1.42)	17.7 (0.70)	1.1 (0.04)	0.3 (0.01)	0.0 (0.0)	—
Average snowfall cm (inches)	—	22.7 (8.9)	23.1 (9.1)	13.3 (5.2)	9.7 (3.8)	—	0.0 (0.0)	0.7 (0.3)	—	32.9 (13.0)	29.7 (11.7)	25.7 (10.1)	—
Average precipitation days (≥ 0.2 mm)	10.8	10.2	11.9	8.0	8.1	8.9	12.8	14.8	13.9	14.8	14.1	11.2	139.5
Average rainy days (≥ 0.2 mm)	—	0.1	0.0	0.1	2.7	—	9.6	13.0	8.9	0.9	0.2	0.2	—
Average snowy days (≥ 0.2 cm)	—	11.6	11.9	5.6	4.2	—	0.1	0.6	—	11.5	12.3	10.9	—
Average relative humidity (%) (at 1500 LST)	68.7	66.6	58.5	57.5	57.9	49.7	57.2	64.1	70.1	79.4	76.6	71.2	64.8
Mean monthly sunshine hours	7.3	65.2	174.1	248.7	295.0	375.1	339.8	216.2	109.4	50.2	17.8	0.0	1,898.8
Source: Environment and Climate Change Canada (January maximum) (April maximum) (May maximum) (July maximum) (August maximum) (sunshine)

== Tourism ==
=== Famous attractions ===
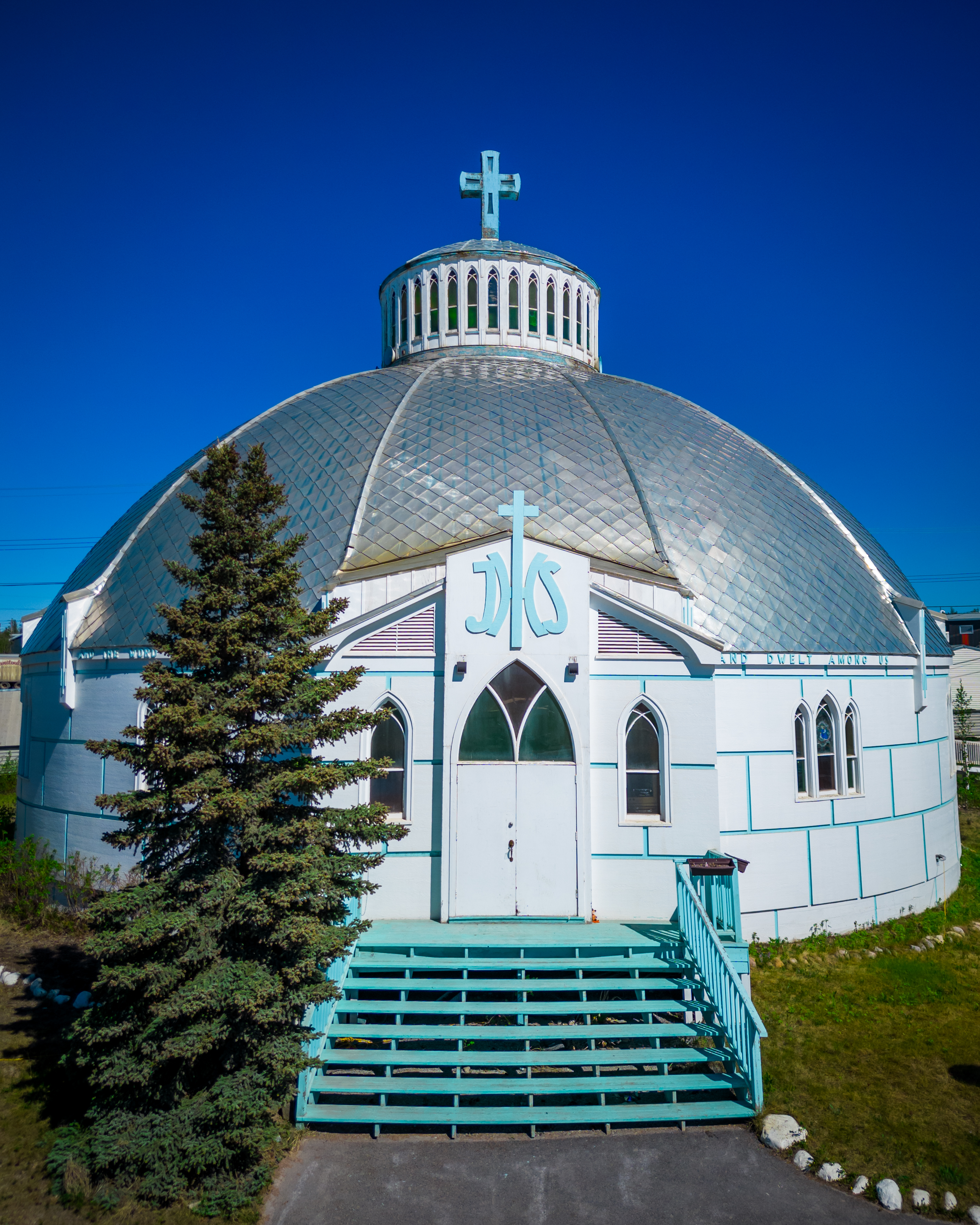
Our Lady of Victory church

Inuvik's Our Lady of Victory Church, often called Igloo Church, is a famous landmark in the region. It is the most-photographed building in the town.

Inuvik has the Midnight Sun Mosque, North America's northernmost, which opened in November 2010 after being built in Winnipeg and moved 4,000 km (2,500 mi) by truck and barge. Some media reports have mistakenly called the mosque "the world's northernmost mosque", but in fact the Nord Kamal Mosque in Norilsk, Russia, and a mosque in Tromsø, Norway, are both slightly further north than Inuvik.

=== Annual events of note ===
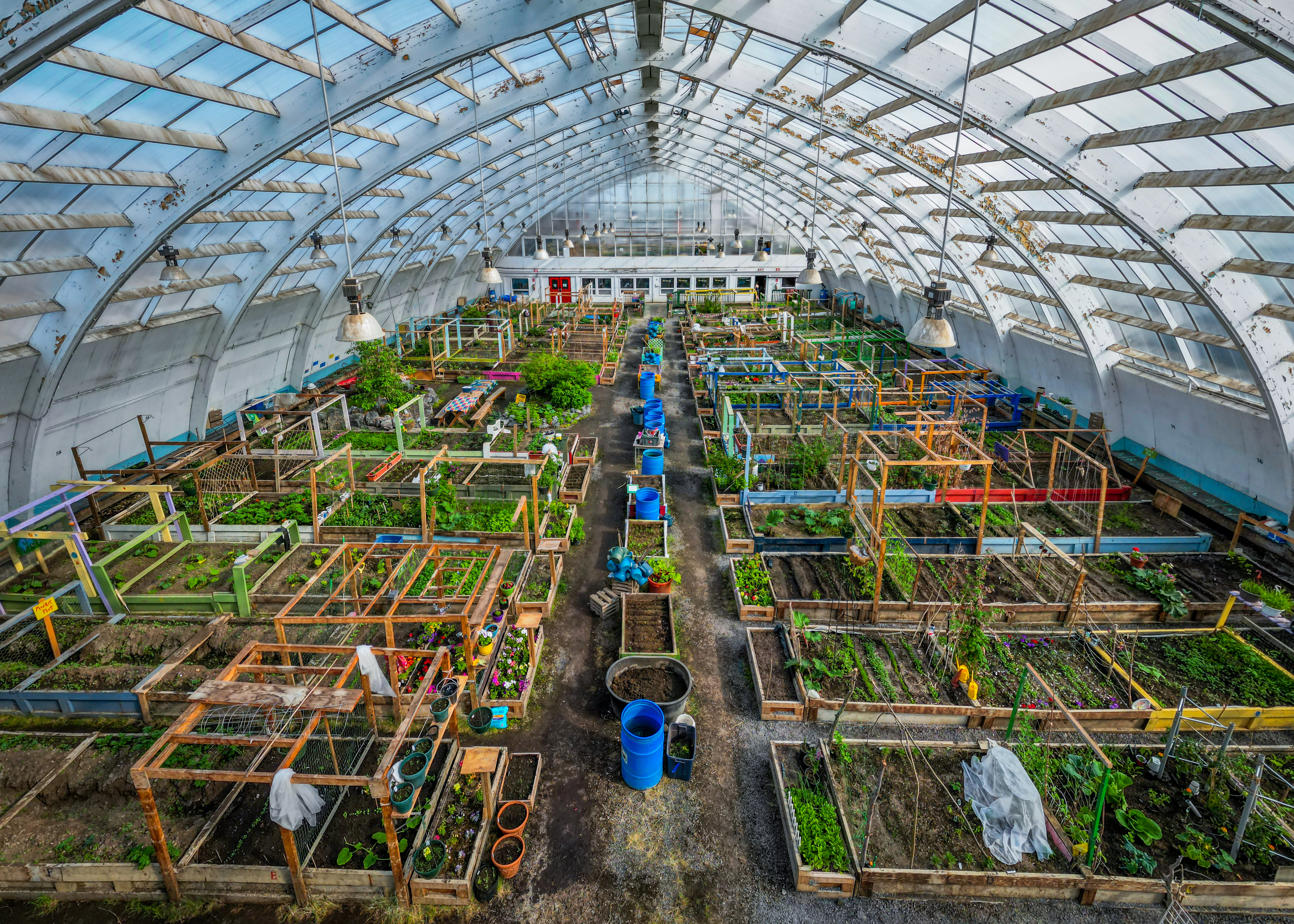
The Inuvik community greenhouse, converted from an old hockey rink

The Great Northern Arts Festival has been held annually for 10 days in the middle of July since 1989. The Festival has hosted over 3,000 artists from across Canada's north, and from as far away as Japan and Australia over 31 years and is the largest annual tourism event in the Beaufort Delta. Featuring on-site demonstrations, 50+ arts workshops, a 3,500-piece gallery, an outdoor carving village, an interactive artist studio zone, nightly cultural performances, northern film screenings, family activities and an Arctic fashion show, the Festival attracts visitors from around the world to travel the Dempster Highway to visit Inuvik and the Gwich'in and Inuvialuit Settlement Regions.

The annual Sunrise Festival happens on the second weekend of the new year, when the sun finally breaks the horizon after about thirty days of polar night. The Festival is an all-day community event highlighted by dog sled races, a long-program fireworks show and community bonfire. This Festival was highlighted in the award-winning 2010 national Tropicana Orange Juice commercial Arctic Sun.

Inuvik celebrates the Muskrat Jamboree each year in late March or early April. Started in 1957, the event brings together thousands of people to participate in traditional games, watch the dog sled and snowmobile races and dance (jig) the night away in town. Most events are held on the Mackenzie River where several community groups operate concessions in stove-heated traditional McPherson tents, preparing hot soup, bannock, baked goods, coffee, Labrador tea, hot chocolate and other traditional refreshments. Many participants and spectators wear traditional clothing and often local artisans will have something to sell. In conjunction with the Muskrat Jamboree, the Town of Inuvik hosts the annual Muskrat Cup 3-on-3 Pond Hockey Tournament on the frozen Mackenzie River, the world's most northerly cash tournament.

The weekend closest to the summer solstice (21 June) each year features the Midnight Sun Fun Run, a 5K, 10K and half marathon that starts at midnight under the 24-hours of sunlight experienced for over 50 days each summer in Inuvik. Runners from around the world make their way north to participate in this unique event under the midnight sun.

== Facilities ==
Roy 'Sugloo' Ipana Memorial Arena

A new hospital opened in early 2003, providing service to an area extending from Sachs Harbour on Banks Island, to Ulukhaktok on Victoria Island, and from Paulatuk into the Sahtu Region including Norman Wells, Tulita, Délı̨nę, Fort Good Hope, and Colville Lake.

The Midnight Sun Complex, a stage-built multi-use facility, was completed in 2006. Featuring the Roy 'Sugloo' Ipana Memorial Arena, with an NHL-sized ice surface; the Inuvik Curling Club with three sheets and a well-situated licensed lounge/viewing area; the Inuvik Pool, an award-winning Class B recreational pool with lane swimming, waterpark features including a two-story waterslide, hot tub, sauna and steam room; two squash courts; a multi-use community hall with stage; on-site business centre/production office; full building wireless; video-conferencing facility; on-site catering/kitchen; and meeting rooms for groups of 5 to 500. At full-building use, the Complex can host conferences, conventions and trade shows with up to 1200 delegates/exhibitors.

The community has a state-of-the-art school called East 3. The construction budget for the school exceeded $110 million, and it features modern technologies such as 'smartboards' and videoconferencing facilities as well as a large gym.

A distinct feature of Inuvik is the use of "utilidors" – above-ground utility conduits carrying water and sewage – which are covered by corrugated steel. They run throughout town connecting most buildings, and as a result there are many small bridges and underpasses. The utilidors are necessary because of the permafrost underlying the town.

== Media ==
=== Print ===
The town was served by the Inuvik Drum, a community newspaper published weekly by Northern News Services until its closure in 2025.

=== Television ===
OTA channel	Call sign	Network	Notes
13 (VHF)	CH4221	Aboriginal Peoples Television Network	

Inuvik was previously served by CHAK-TV, VHF channel 6, a CBC North television repeater of CFYK-DT (Yellowknife). That station closed on 31 July 2012 due to budget cuts affecting the CBC.

=== Radio ===
Frequency	Call sign	Branding	Format	Owner	Notes
AM 860	CHAK	CBC Radio One	Talk radio, public radio	Canadian Broadcasting Corporation	Part of CBC North; broadcasts programming in English, Gwichʼin, and Inuvialuktun
FM 98.7	CKRW-FM-2	The Rush	Hot adult contemporary	Klondike Broadcasting	Rebroadcaster of CKRW-FM (Whitehorse)
FM 101.9	VF2082	CKLB Radio: The Voice of Denendeh	Community radio	Native Communications Society of the Northwest Territories	First Nations community radio; rebroadcaster of CKLB-FM (Yellowknife)

== Communications ==
Landline telephone service is provided by Northwestel, and cellular service by Ice Wireless and Arctic Digital (Bell Mobility). Cable television is also offered in Inuvik by New North Networks.

Fibre optic communications were added in Inuvik in June 2017 with the completion of the Mackenzie Valley Fibre Link; the $82 million 1,200 km (750 mi) line adds new capability to the town. However, the dependence on this single trunk line occasionally caused widespread Internet outages during Dempster or Alaska Highway maintenance or construction.

5G network services became available in Inuvik as of July 2025, marking a significant advancement in the region's telecommunications infrastructure.

The Dempster Fibre Line, a 778 km (483 mi) fibre optic line, that runs along the Dempster Highway from Dawson City and connects to the Mackenzie Valley Fibre Link from Inuvik was completed 12 September 2024. The line, which was brought into operation 26 November 2024, brings backup to the Mackenzie Valley Fibre Link.

The federal government supported the project financially through two programs contributing nearly $60 million. Combined with the Mackenzie Valley Fibre Line, the new connection will close the Canada North Fibre Loop and provide service redundancies for the 4,000 km (2,500 mi) network.

== Planetary nomenclature ==
In 1988, the International Astronomical Union's Working Group for Planetary System Nomenclature (IAU / WGPSN) officially adopted the name Inuvik for a crater on Mars, at 78.7° north latitude and 28.6° west longitude. The crater's diameter is 20.5 km (12.7 mi).

== Notable people ==
- Leona Aglukkaq, former member of Parliament for the electoral district of Nunavut and former Minister of Health
- Roger Allen, former member of the Legislative Assembly of the Northwest Territories and Olympian
- Zac Boyer, former National Hockey League right winger
- Tom Butters, former member of the Legislative Assembly of the Northwest Territories
- Jason Elliott, former professional ice hockey player
- Fred Koe, former member of the Legislative Assembly of the Northwest Territories
- Floyd Roland, former mayor of Inuvik and former Premier and member of the Legislative Assembly of the Northwest Territories
- Richard Nerysoo, former chief of the Gwich'in Tribal Council, former member of the Legislative Assembly of the Northwest Territories, former Speaker of the Legislative Assembly of the Northwest Territories, and former Premier of the Northwest Territories
- Eric Schweig, Inuvialuit / Chippewa / Dene actor
- Willow Allen, model

== See also ==
- List of municipalities in the Northwest Territories
- Vertical Distribution of Ice in Arctic Clouds
