= List of mosques in Russia =

This is a list of mosques in Russia. The construction of mosques in Russia has been documented from the 1550s to 2010 and mirrors the history of Islam in Russia. Russian mosques span the mosques of Europe and Asia.

== Mosques ==
Name	Image	Locality	Federal subject	Established	Notes
White Mosque of Astrakhan		Astrakhan	Astrakhan	1810	
Black Mosque of Astrakhan		Astrakhan	Astrakhan	1816	
Red Mosque of Astrakhan		Astrakhan	Astrakhan	1990	
Nur Mosque		Burzyansky District	Bashkortostan		
Salavat Mosque		Salavat	Bashkortostan	1985	
Halid bin Walid Mosque		Sterlitamak	Bashkortostan	2007	
Sufiya Mosque		Sterlitamaksky District	Bashkortostan	2008	
Uchaly Mosque		Uchaly	Bashkortostan	1990s	
Zaynulla Rasulev Mosque		Uchaly	Bashkortostan	2009	
Ar-Rahim Mosque		Ufa	Bashkortostan		
Asiya Mosque		Ufa	Bashkortostan	2002	
Gufran Mosque		Ufa	Bashkortostan	1994	
Hakimiya Mosque		Ufa	Bashkortostan	1908	
Hamza Hadji		Ufa	Bashkortostan	2006	
Ihlas Mosque		Ufa	Bashkortostan	2001	
Madina Mosque		Ufa	Bashkortostan	2013	
Munira Mosque		Ufa	Bashkortostan	2011	
Lala Tulpan		Ufa	Bashkortostan	1998	
Mosque of Twenty-Five Prophets		Ufa	Bashkortostan	2010	
Tukayev Mosque		Ufa	Bashkortostan	1830	
Alekseevka Mosque		Ufimsky District	Bashkortostan	2004	
Akhmad Kadyrov Mosque		Grozny	Chechnya	2008	
Pride of Muslims Mosque		Shali	Chechnya	2019	
Bulgar Mosque (Cheboksary)		Cheboksary	Chuvashia	2005	
Friday Mosque		Derbent	Dagestan	733	
Grand Mosque of Makhachkala		Makhachkala	Dagestan	1996	
Ivanovo Mosque		Ivanovo	Ivanovo	2003	
Hay Market Mosque		Kaliningrad	Kaliningrad		
Nord Kamal Mosque		Norilsk	Krasnoyarsk Krai	1998	
Memorial Mosque		Moscow	Moscow	1997	
Moscow Cathedral Mosque		Moscow	Moscow	1904, 2015	
Old Mosque, Moscow		Moscow	Moscow	1823	
Fair Mosque		Nizhny Novgorod	Nizhny Novgorod	1817	
Nizhny Novgorod Cathedral Mosque		Nizhny Novgorod	Nizhny Novgorod	1915	
Mukhtarov Mosque		Vladikavkaz	North Ossetia–Alania	1908	
Husainia Mosque		Orenburg	Orenburg	1892	
Old Mosque			Orenburg		
Orenburg Caravanserai		Orenburg	Orenburg	1846	
Ramazan Mosque			Orenburg		
Suleimaniya Mosque			Orenburg		
Penza Mosque		Penza	Penza Oblast		
Perm Mosque		Perm	Perm Krai	1903	
Saint Petersburg Mosque		St Petersburg	St Petersburg	1913	
Khan's Mosque		Kasimov	Ryazan	1550s, 1768, 1835	
Great Mosque of Podlipki		Podlipki	Ryazan	1880	
Old Mosque, Samara		Samara	Samara	1891	
Samara Mosque		Samara	Samara	1999	
Azigulovo Mosque		Achitsky District	Sverdlovsk Oblast		
White Mosque (Bolghar)		Bolgar	Tatarstan	1992	
Äcem Mosque		Kazan	Tatarstan	1890	
Thousandth Anniversary of Islam Mosque		Kazan	Tatarstan	1926	
Bornay Mosque		Kazan	Tatarstan	1872	
Bulgar Mosque		Kazan	Tatarstan	1993	
Iske Tash Mosque		Kazan	Tatarstan	1802	
Märcani Mosque		Kazan	Tatarstan	1770	
Nurulla Mosque		Kazan	Tatarstan	1849	
Kul Sharif Mosque		Kazan	Tatarstan	2005	
Soltan Mosque		Kazan	Tatarstan	1868	
Tauba Mosque		Naberezhnye Chelny	Tatarstan	1992	
Nizhnekamsk Mosque		Nizhnekamsk	Tatarstan	1996	
White Mosque (Tomsk)		Tomsk	Tomsk Oblast	1913	
Red Mosque (Tomsk)		Tomsk	Tomsk Oblast	1904	
Tver Mosque		Tver	Tver	1906	
Yaroslavl Mosque		Yaroslavl	Yaroslavl	1914	
