= Acem =

Acem may refer to:

- Acem Meditation
- The Turkish spelling for Ajam
  - The Turkish spelling for the Ajam (maqam)
- Äcem Mosque
