= 71st Cavalry Regiment =

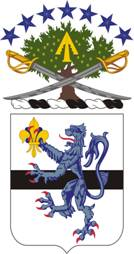
- Coat of arms
- Active: 1941–1945, 1947–1957, 2004–2024
- Country: United States
- Type: Armor
- Motto: "Gallantly Forward"
- Engagements: World War II; War on terror; Iraq War

Insignia
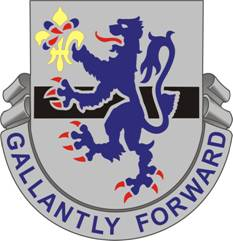
- Distinctive unit insignia

The 71st Cavalry was originally constituted on 3 December 1941 in the Army of the United States as the 701st Tank Destroyer Battalion.

== History ==
The unit was activated on 15 December 1941 at Fort Knox, Kentucky. The unit saw action throughout World War II and earned campaign participation in Algeria-French Morocco, Tunisia, Naples-Foggia, Anzio, Rome-Arno, North Apennines, and the Po Valley.

The 701st was inactivated on 29 October 1945 at Fort Leonard Wood, Missouri. The unit was converted and redesignated on 27 August 1947 as the 327th Mechanized Cavalry Reconnaissance Squadron, and allotted to the Organized Reserves. It was again converted and redesignated on 22 March 1949 as the 327th Heavy Tank Battalion. On 17 November 1950, it was inactivated at Ottumwa, Iowa only to be converted and redesignated on 27 February 1951 as the 701st Armored Infantry Battalion; concurrently, withdrawn from the Organized Reserve Corps, allotted to the Regular Army, and assigned to the 1st Armored Division.

On 7 March 1951, the 701st AIB moved to Fort Hood, Texas for a period of six years until it was inactivated on 15 February 1957 at Fort Polk, Louisiana, and relieved from assignment to the 1st Armored Division. In September 2004, the 71st Cavalry was activated from newly assigned Soldiers as well as existing units from the Division.

11 months after activation, 1-71 CAV deployed in support of Operation Iraqi Freedom IV. The squadron began combat operations throughout AO Cobra in Western Baghdad, with a primary mission as the Military Transition Team (MiTT), partnered up with 1st Brigade, 6th Division of the Iraqi Army.

In late February and through much of May, the squadron surged in response to an attack on the Samarra Mosque. Intense 24-hour patrols throughout AO Cobra saturated the area, showing support for the Iraqi people and the Iraqi Security Forces. Throughout this time, the squadron's efforts assisted in easing sectarian tensions during a tenuous time.

By the first of April, the squadron was released from the MiTT mission and tasked with a new AO on the western outskirts of Baghdad. AO Ghost included the strategic target Abu Ghraib compound and 18 kilometers of corps MSR. Throughout this period, the squadron once again was forced into a non-contiguous battlefield with a command and control node at Abu Ghraib. The rural environment of AO Ghost is the antithesis to that of the urban AO Cobra, enlisting the soldiers of 1-71 CAV to adapt over the course of six months to new, wide-open surroundings.

1-71 CAV redeployed with 1BCT, 10th Mountain Division in July 2006. The unit recovered and prepared for another tour in Iraq.

1-71 CAV again deployed in August 2007 – November 2008 in support of Operation Iraqi Freedom, during the "Surge" for a 15-month rotation.

In March 2010, 1-71 CAV was again called upon to be deployed to combat, this time the Squadron was sent to Afghanistan in support of Operation Enduring Freedom. They were deployed for 13-months and redeployed in April 2011

In 2015, 3-71 and 1-71 combined into one Squadron and were re-flagged as 3-71 CAV for 1st Brigade Combat Team, 10th Mountain Division at Fort Drum, NY.

== Distinctive unit insignia ==
The unit insignia is a Silver color metal and enamel device 1 1/8 inches (2.9 cm) in height overall consisting of a shield blazoned: Argent, a bar Sable, overall a lion rampant Azure holding in dexter paw a fleur-de-lis Or. Attached below and to the sides of the shield a Silver scroll inscribed "GALLANTLY FORWARD" in Blue letters.

The symbolism is that the colors blue and white are for Infantry, the previous unit designation. Black and golden orange were the colors used for Tank Destroyer organizations, indicating the unit's origin. The raging lion symbolizes aggressive and warlike qualities. The fleur-de-lis is gold (for golden orange) to indicate the battle honors were awarded to the organization as a Tank Destroyer unit in World War II.

The distinctive unit insignia was originally approved for the 701st Armored Infantry Battalion on 28 April 1952. It was redesignated with the description and symbolism updated for the 71st Cavalry Regiment on 10 August 2004.

== Coat of arms ==
- Blazon
  - Shield- Argent, a bar Sable, overall a lion rampant Azure holding in dexter paw a fleur-de-lis Or.
  - Crest- From a wreath Argent and Sable below an arc of seven mullets Azure an olive tree fructed Proper charged with a pheon Or, in base two cavalry swords points down saltirewise Proper.
  - Motto '"Gallantly Forward".
- Symbolism
  - Crest- The stars commemorate the seven campaign participation credits the unit earned in World War II. Blue and white underscore Infantry history. The olive tree, native to the Mediterranean Sea region, recalls the area of operation of their World War II service. The cavalry swords recall the unit's history and symbolize the armored cavalry mission. The spear point (pheon) gives emphasis to military action and going forward in battle.
  - Shield- The colors blue and white are for Infantry, the previous unit designation. Black and golden orange were the colors used for Tank Destroyer organizations, indicating the unit's origin. The raging lion symbolizes aggressive and warlike qualities. The fleur-de-lis is gold (for golden orange) to indicate the battle honors were awarded to the organization as a Tank Destroyer unit in World War II.
- Background- The coat of arms was originally approved for the 701st Armored Infantry Battalion on 28 April 1952. It was redesignated for the 71st Cavalry Regiment and amended to add a crest on 27 August 2004.

== See also ==
- List of armored and cavalry regiments of the United States Army
