= Soltan Mosque =

Mosque in Kazan, Tatarstan, Russia

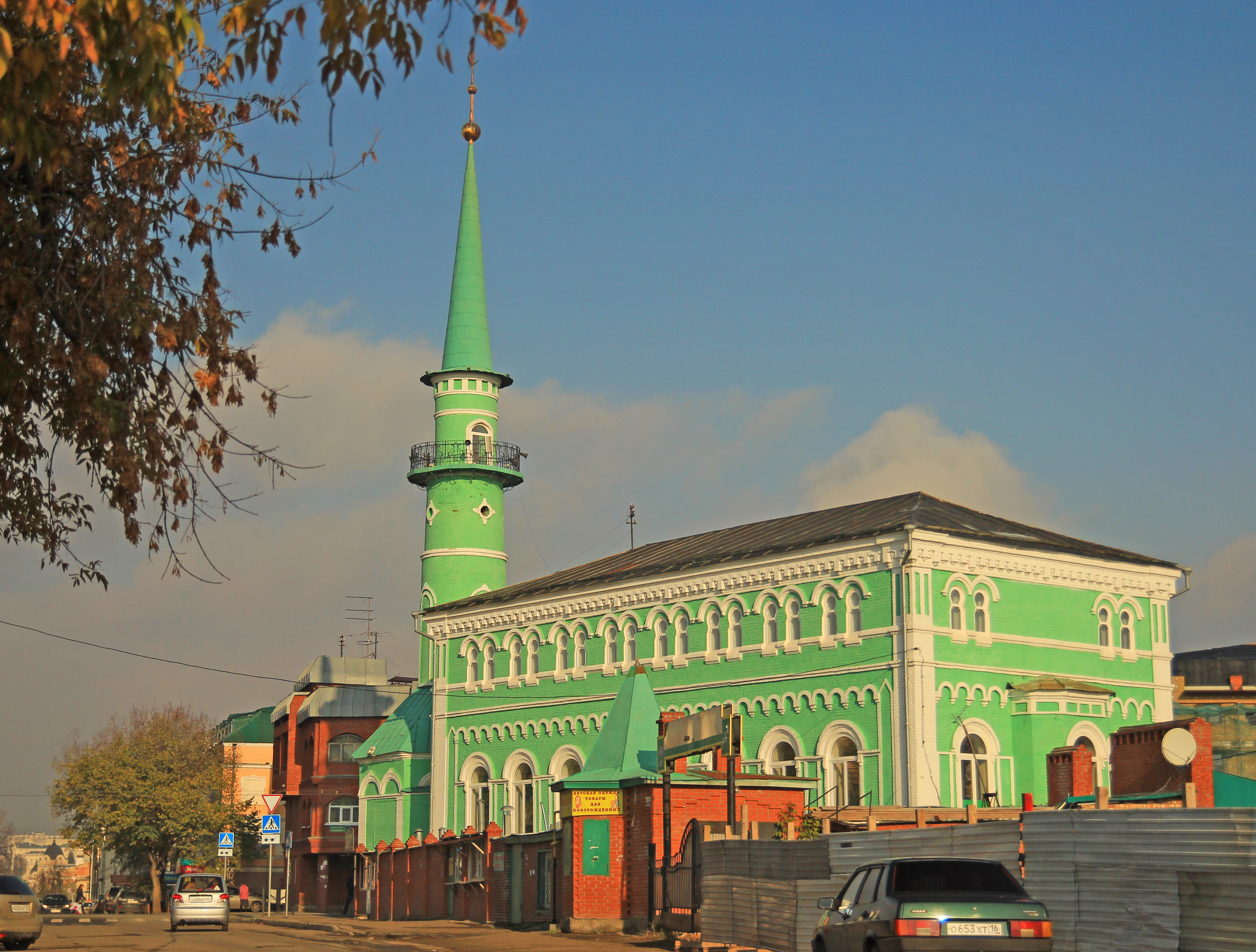

Religion
- Affiliation: Islam
- District: Tatarstan
- Status: Active

Location
- Location: Kazan, Russia
- Interactive map of Soltan Mosque
- Coordinates: 55°46′33″N 49°07′07″E

Architecture
- Type: Mosque
- Style: Volga Tatar Medieval, National Romance
- Completed: 1868
- Minaret: 1

The Soltan Mosque (Cyrillic: Солтан мәчете; formerly Cihanşa bay Mosque, The Red Mosque, Ğosman Mosque, The Eighth Mosque, also spelled Sultan or Sultanovskaya via Russian Султановская мечеть) is a mosque in Kazan, Russia.

== History ==
It was built in 1868 on the donation of merchant Cihanşa Ğosmanov. The mosque is built in traditions of the Tatar-Bolghar medieval architecture combined with national romance style. There is one hall with entresol. The three-storied minaret is placed over the entry.

On November 11, 1931 the mosque was closed by the Soviet authorities. In 1990 the minaret was restored, in 1994 the mosque was returned to believers.

== Gallery ==
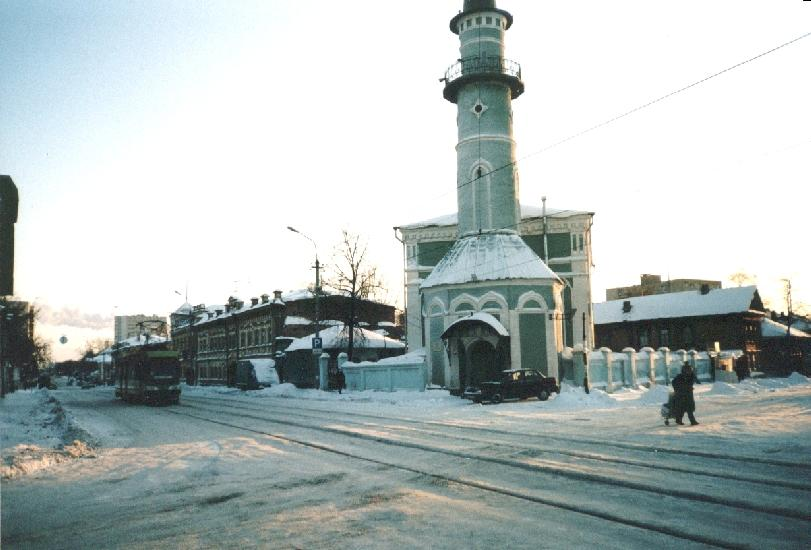

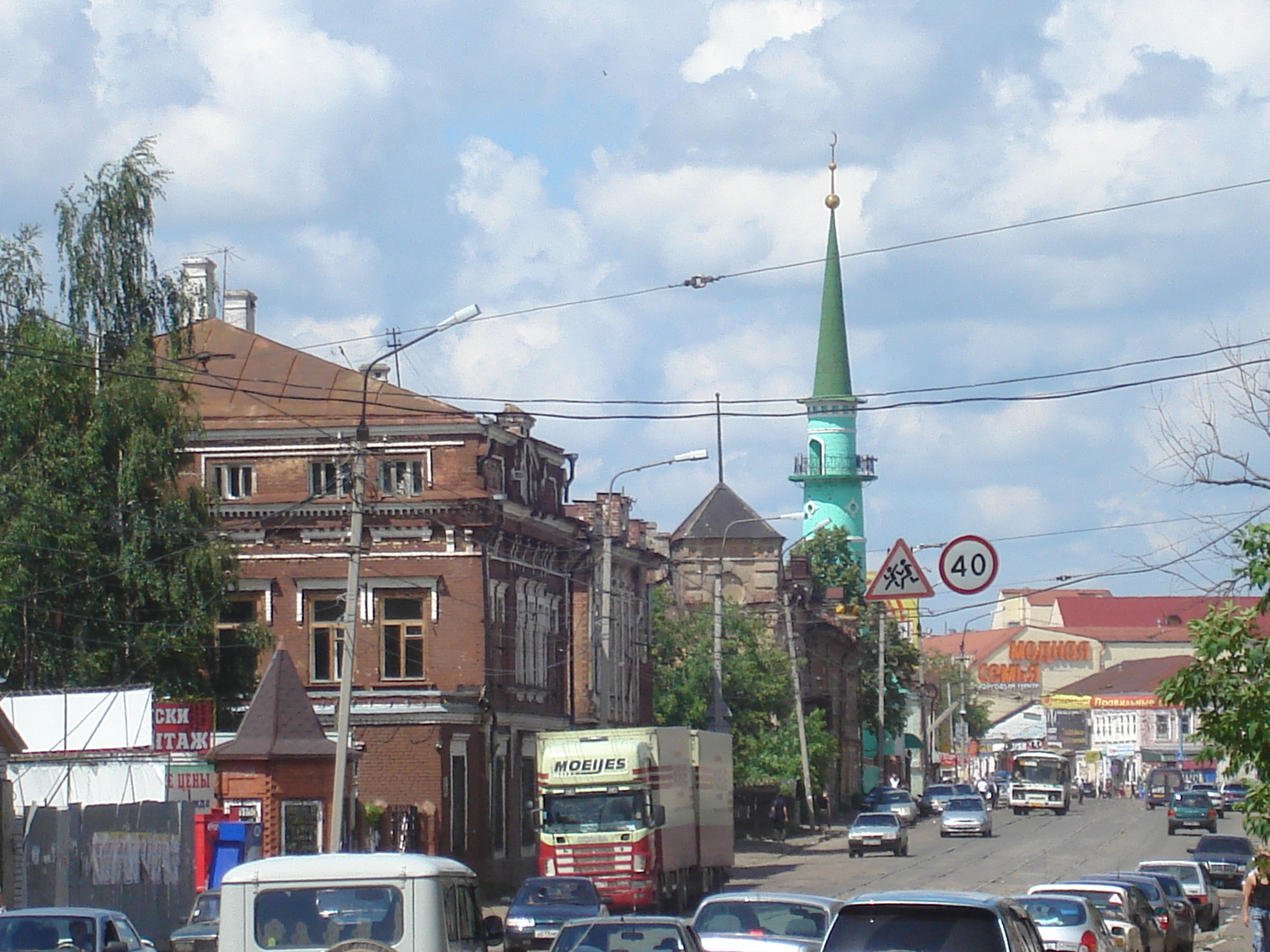

== See also ==
- Islam in Tatarstan
- Islam in Russia
- List of mosques in Russia
- List of mosques in Europe
- Sultan Mosque in Singapore
