= Bulgar Mosque (Cheboksary) =

Mosque in Cheboksary, Chuvashia, Russia

- Мечеть Булгар
- Location within Russia

Location
- Location: Cheboksary, Chuvashia, Russia
- Interactive map of Bulgar Mosque
- Coordinates: 56.1119°N 47.2442°E

Architecture
- Type: Mosque
- Established: 14 September 2005

The Bulgar Mosque (Russian: Мечеть Булгар, Tatar: Болгар мәчет, Chuvash: Пӑлхар мечетӗ) is a mosque in the city of Cheboksary, Chuvashia, Russia. It is located on the outskirts of the city. Russian Grand Mufti Talgat Tadzhuddin opened it on September 14, 2005.

The mosque is named after the medieval Volga-Bulgarian capital of Bolghar, and is a revered center of Islam in the Volga region.

== See also ==
- Islam in Russia
- List of mosques in Russia
- List of mosques in Europe
