= Orenburg Muslim Spiritual Assembly =

- Оренбургское магометанское духовное собрание
- Formation: 1788
- Founder: Catherine the Great

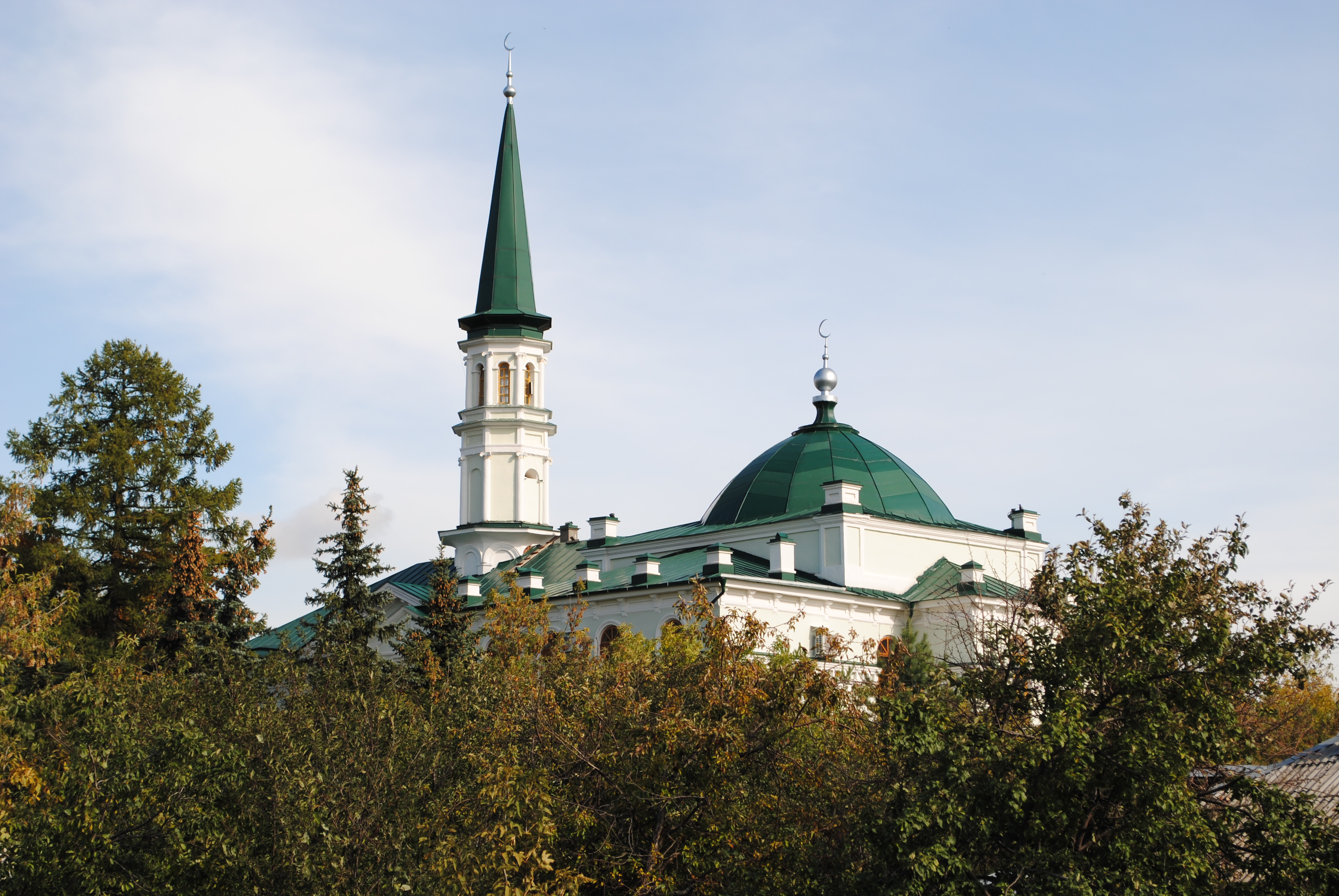
The Old Mosque, Ufa was constructed by the Orenburg Muslim Spiritual Assembly in 1830.

The Orenburg Muslim Spiritual Assembly (Russian: Оренбургское магометанское духовное собрание) was a state-controlled religious administration in the Russian Empire that had jurisdiction over certain aspects of Islamic activity in Siberia, the Volga-Ural region, and parts of Central Asia, including the Kazakh steppe. It was established in 1788 by order of Russian Empress Catherine II.

It was one of several religious bodies created in the Russian Empire, forming state-allied 'clergies' to manage non-Orthodox religions.

== History ==
In 1791, the similar Tauride Muslim Spiritual Authority was created, presiding over Crimean Tatars.

In the 1830s, the Department of Religious Affairs gave support to the Orenburg Assembly in religious disputes with the Hanafi and Sufi schools of thought

The Kazakhs were removed from the assembly's jurisdiction in the 1860s as part of a policy to decrease the exposure of the Kazakhs to Tartar influence.

According to statistics from 1883, the Orenburg Muslim Spiritual Assembly presided over 4,093 mosques, 7,341 ulema, and 2.14 million Muslims.

== Structure ==
The head position in the assembly was mufti, under whom there were 5 or 6 qazis.

=== Mufti ===
The role of the mufti was established in the assembly's founding documents of 1788, however neither his social status or the scope of his powers were made clear. The first mufti, Mukhamedzhan Khusainov, immediately began to push for more power, demanding the same status as the Metropolitan of the Russian Orthodox Church. He met several times with Catherine II in St. Petersburg, and began to see himself as an important political figure in the Volga-Ural region. This worried local Russian administrators, who requested and received permission from Prince Alexander Bezborodko to severely limit Khusainov's influence and keep him under their control. Local authorities then decreed "his [the mufti's] duty is to administer strictly religious matters, and not to touch secular ones, except when the administrations sees fit to use him for these".

According to an 1802 decree the mufti could not make any decisions without the consent of his deputies, however this was rarely followed by Khusainov. The first mufti was constantly dogged with lawsuits and complaints concerning bribery, swindling, and failure to follow salat. Though Emperor Alexander I sent a letter supporting Khusainov, and in effect granting him legal immunity, charges over Khusainov's abuse of power continued for the duration of his time as mufti.

Assembly Muftis
Date	Name
September 22, 1788 - July 17, 1824	Mukhammed-zhan Khusainov
September 30, 1825 - January 31, 1840	Gabdessalyam Gabdrakhimov
June 10, 1840 - August 4, 1862	Gabdulvakhid Suleymanov
April 28, 1865 - January 2, 1885	Salimgarey Tevkelev
January 2, 1886 - August 15, 1915	Mukhammed-yar Sultanov
July 28, 1915 - March 22, 1917	Mukhammed-Safa Bayazitov

== See also ==
- Islam in Russia
- Islam in Central Asia
- Spiritual Administration of the Muslims of Central Asia and Kazakhstan
- Muftiate
- List of Islamic Muftiates
