= Mosque of Twenty-Five Prophets =

Mosque in Ufa, Bashkortostan, Russia

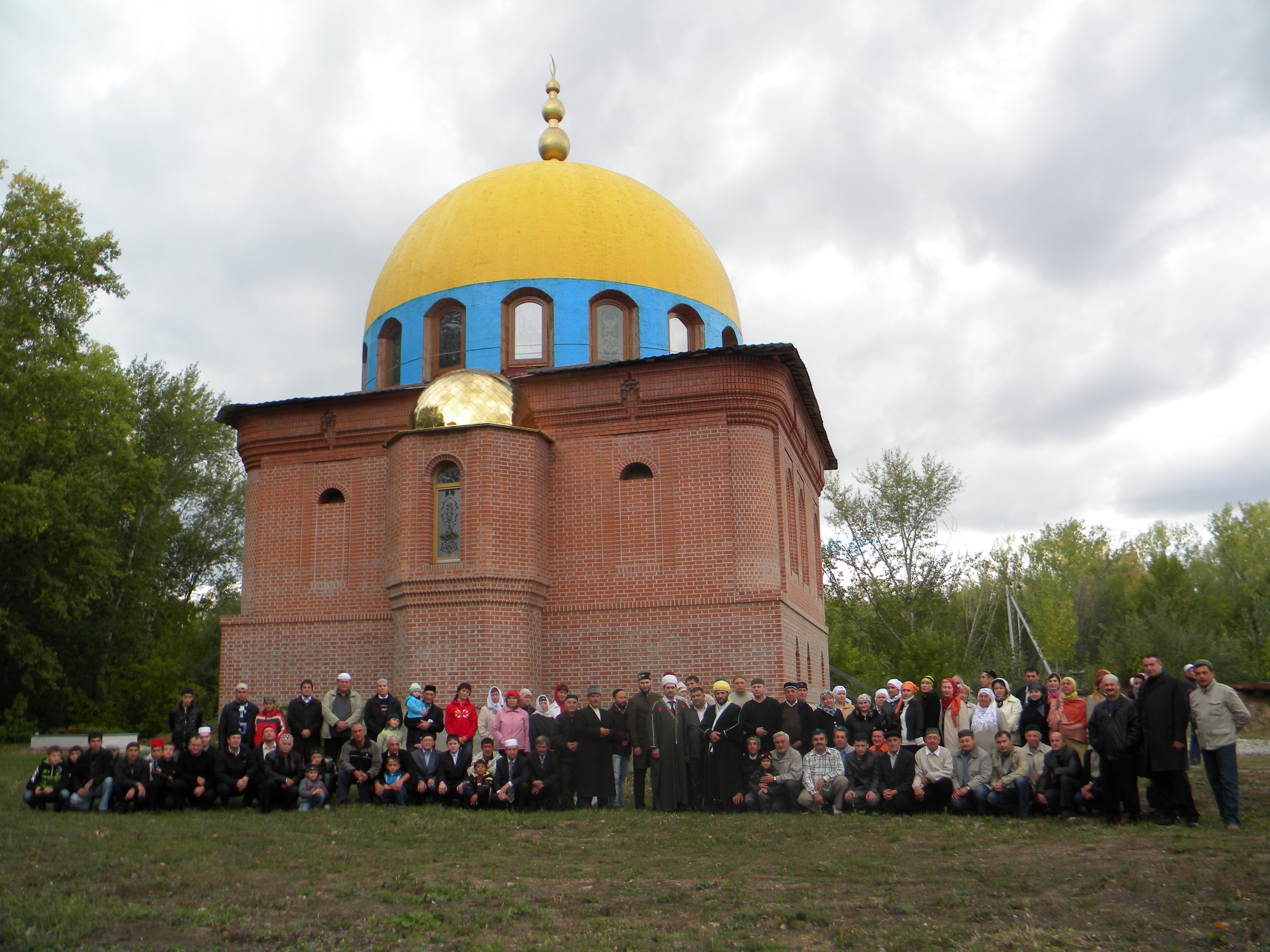

Religion
- Affiliation: Islam
- Status: Active

Location
- Location: Ufa, Russia
- Interactive map of Mosque of Twenty-Five Prophets
- Coordinates: 54.7018°N 55.9367°E

Architecture
- Architect: F. Z. Ikhsanov
- Type: Mosque
- Completed: 16 June 2010

The Mosque of Twenty-Five Prophets (Bashkir: 25 Пәйғәмбәр мәсете, Arabic: مسجد 25 نبيّ, Russian: Мечеть двадцати пяти Пророков) is situated in the southern part of the city of Ufa, the capital of the Republic of Bashkortostan, in the Russian Federation. Construction began on the mosque on 16 June 1995 (the birthday of the Islamic prophet Muhammad), and ended fifteen years later on that same day.

The mosque was initially named ZaFaZa-Ihsan, but when research by the son of the founders noted that there is no mosque in the world named for the twenty-five prophets named in the Quran, the mosque was accordingly named after that group.

== See also ==
- Islam in Russia
- List of mosques in Russia
- List of mosques in Europe
