= Bulgar Mosque =

Mosque in Kazan, Tatarstan, Russia

- Мечеть Булгар
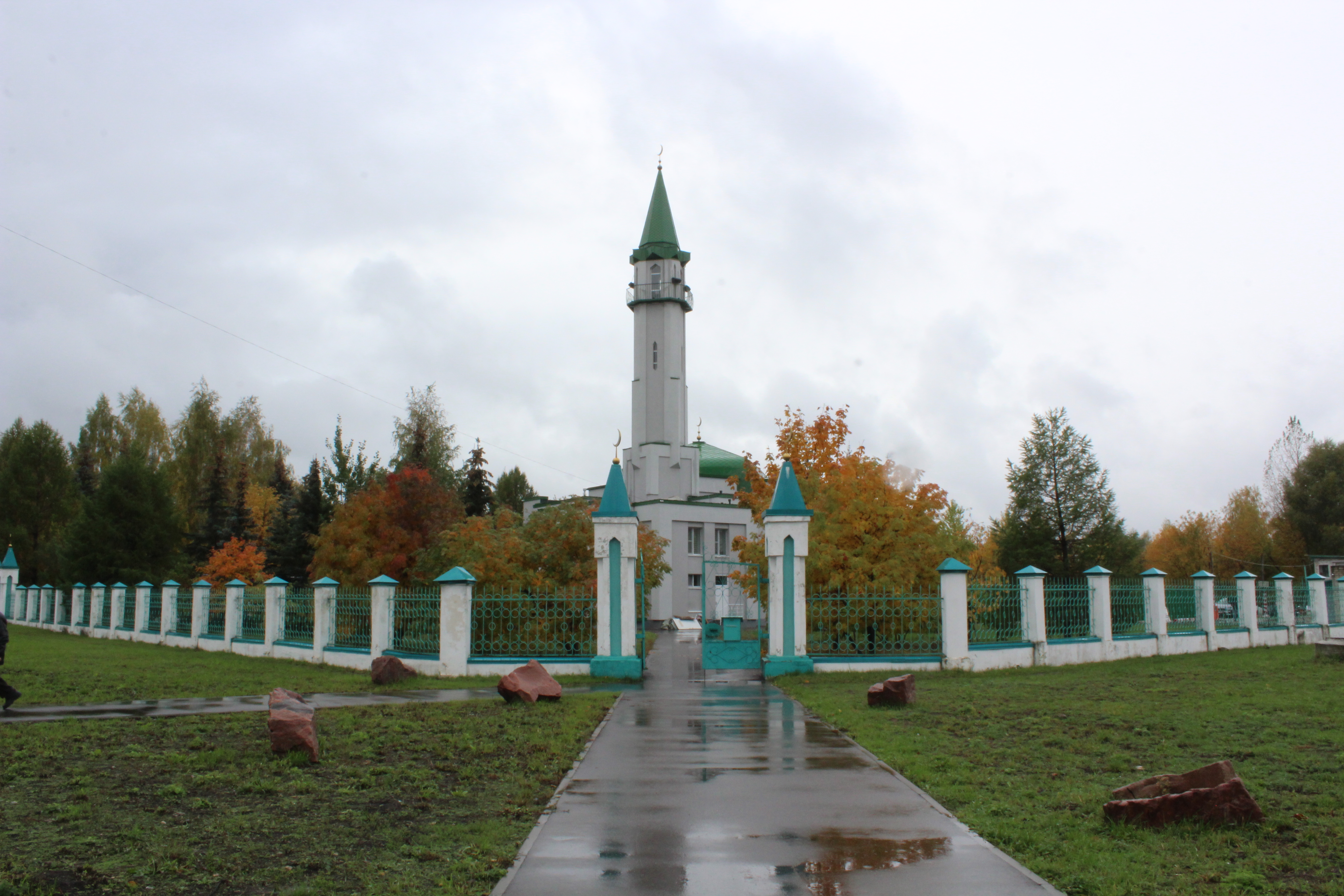

- Location within Russia

Location
- Location: Kazan, Tatarstan, Russia
- Interactive map of Bulgar Mosque
- Coordinates: 55.8350°N 49.1198°E

Architecture
- Type: Mosque
- Established: 1993
- Groundbreaking: 1990s
- Minaret height: 35 m

Bulgar Mosque (Russian: Мечеть Булгар; Tatar: Болгар мәчет), is a mosque in Kazan, Tatarstan, Russia.

The building is located in a new part of the Tatar capital, in the Novo-Savinovsk district. The mosque is constructed in order to commemorate the 1100th anniversary of the Islamisation of Volga-Bulgaria, and opened in 1993. For most of the construction work is responsible the first imam, Farooq hazrat Fazanov. After him is named the madrasah of the mosque.

The construction of the Bulgar Mosque started in the beginning of the 1990s. The piece of land that was meant for the building, was a desolate swampy place. That's why the first job of the construction workers was to clear the terrain. The architects of the Bulgar Mosque are Valeriy Voginov, and Yevgeni Prokofiev.

The Muslim mosque has a very original composition. In it are combined different objects varying by height, that are cut into each other diagonally from southwest to northeast. As is tradition, the mosque has separate entrances and rooms for men and women. The main prayer hall is on the second floor, while the room for women is on the first. The minaret is 35 meters high. The whole complex is constructed with white bricks, that seem to be in harmony with the apartment blocks that are around the mosque. Specialists describe the Bulgar Mosque as a modern Muslim mosque, with a rationalist design.

== See also ==
- Islam in Tatarstan
- Islam in Russia
- List of mosques in Russia
- List of mosques in Europe
