= Sufiya Mosque =

Mosque in Bashkortostan, Russia

- Мечеть Суфия́
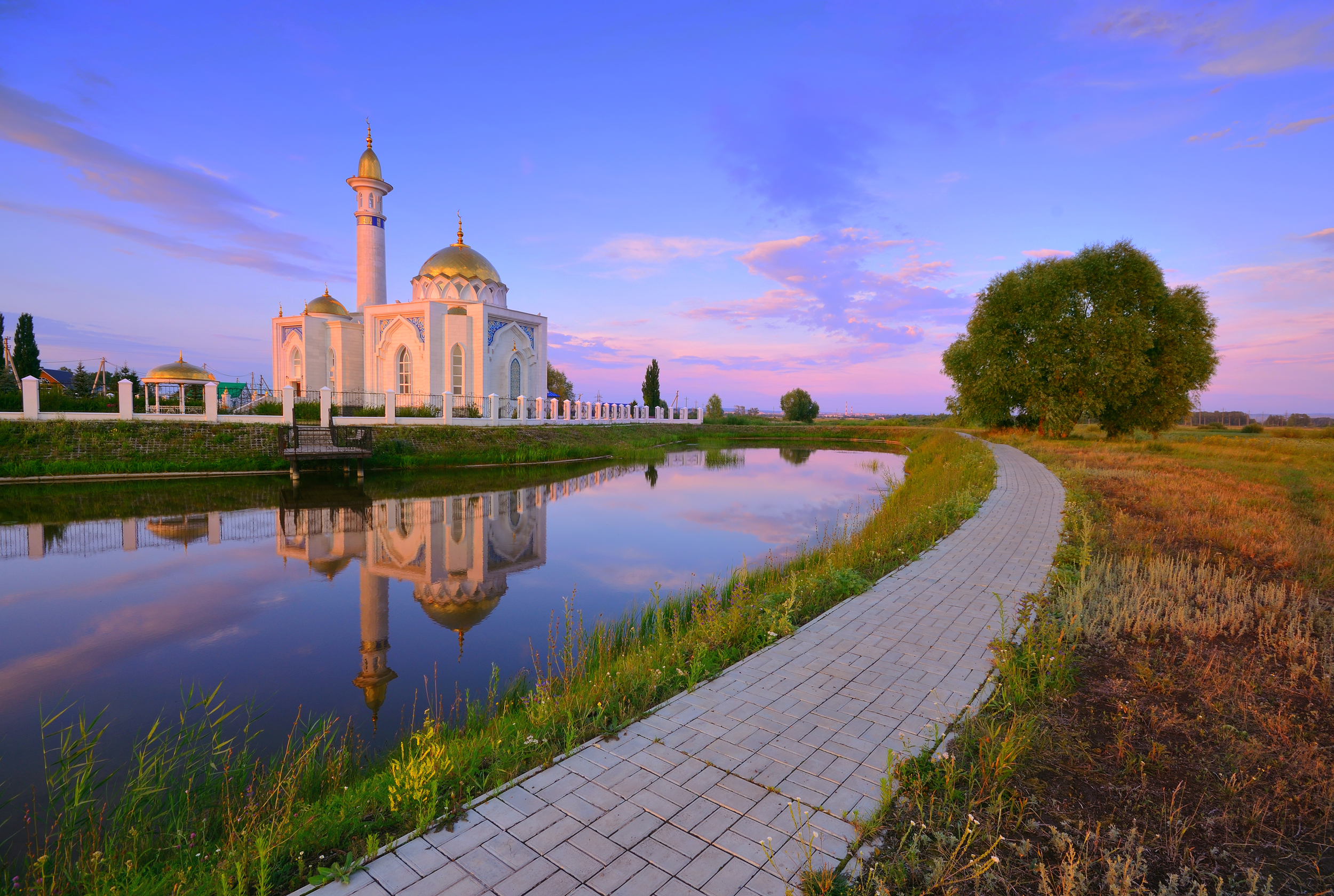

Religion
- Affiliation: Islam
- Region: Bashkortostan

Location
- Country: Russia
- Interactive map of Sufiya Mosque
- Coordinates: 53.442651°N 55.938604°E

Architecture
- Architect: Aivar Sattarov

The Sufiya Mosque (Russian: Мечеть Суфия́; Tatar: «Суфия» мәчете, Bashkir: «Суфия» мәсете), better known as Kantyukov Mosque, is a mosque, located in the Tatar village of Kantyukovka in the Sterlitamaksky district in the Republic of Bashkortostan in Russia.

== History ==
The project, according to the chief architect, Aivar Sattarov, was based on the interweaving of oriental motifs, as well as the cultures of the Tatar and Bashkir peoples. The mosque was built at the request of the village residents with sponsorship from Rafkat Kantyukov, a native of Kantyukovka and now the general director of Gazprom Transgaz Kazan.

== Gallery ==
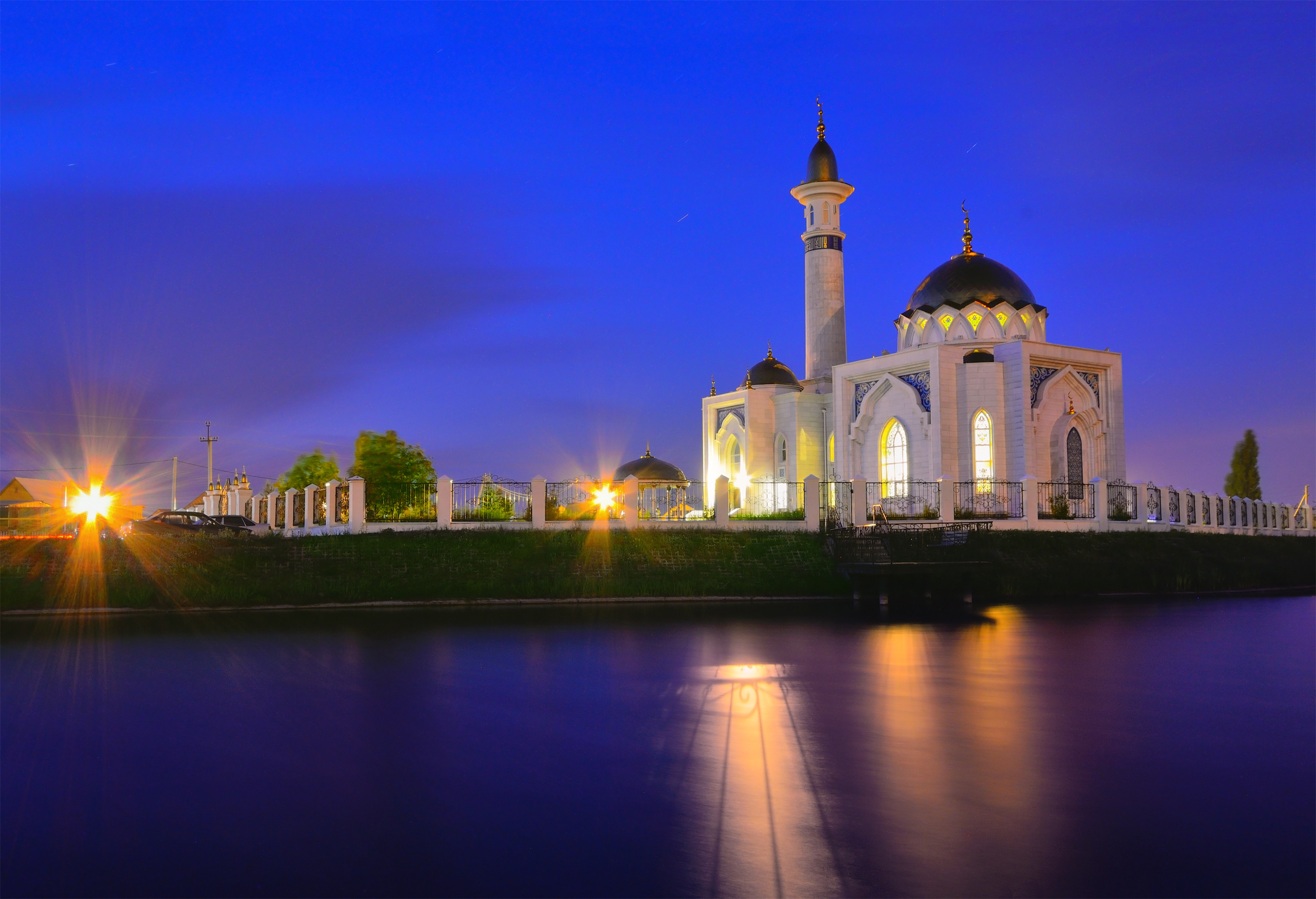
At dusk

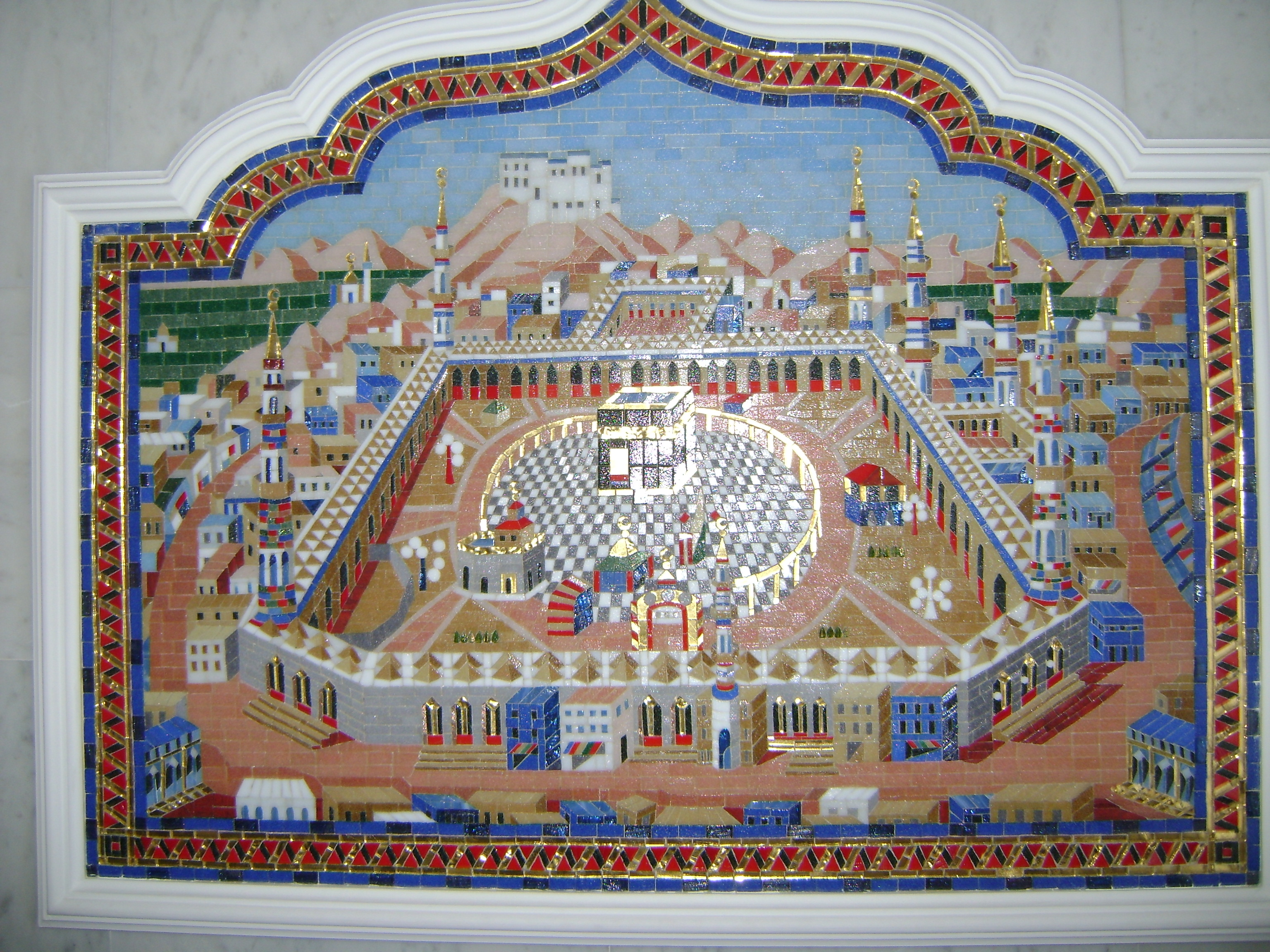
Mosaic inside the mosque

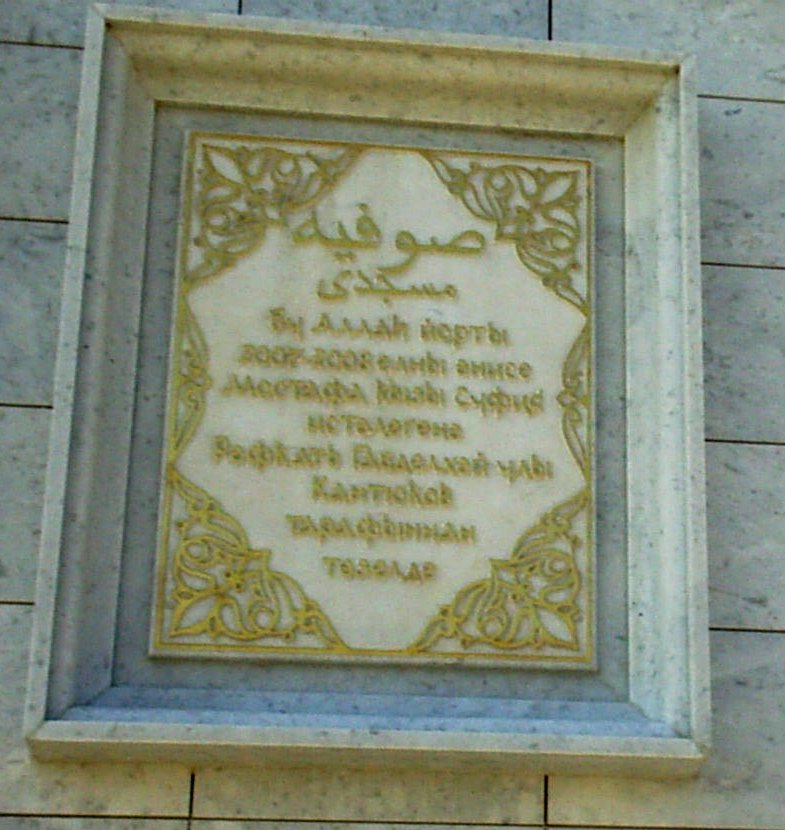
Memorial plaque

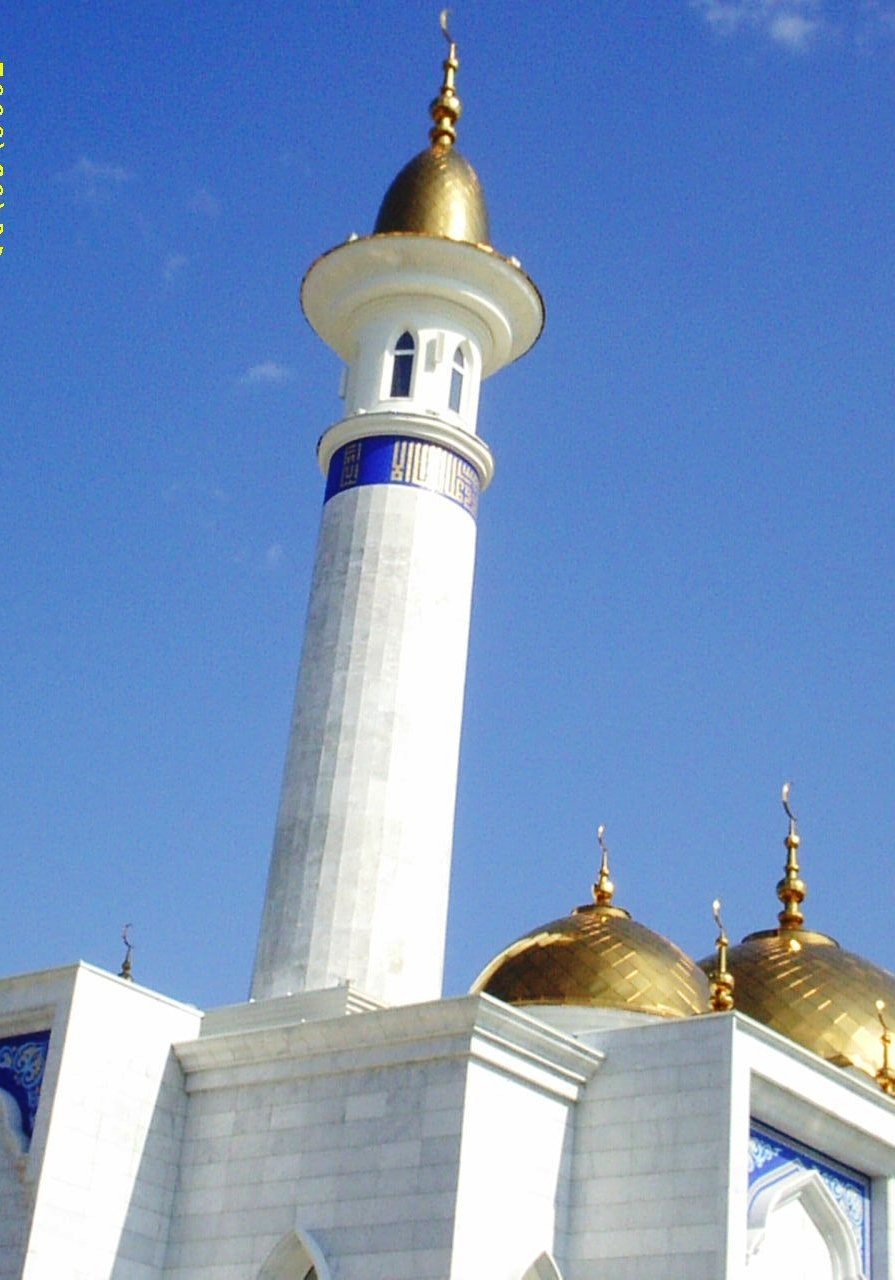
Minaret

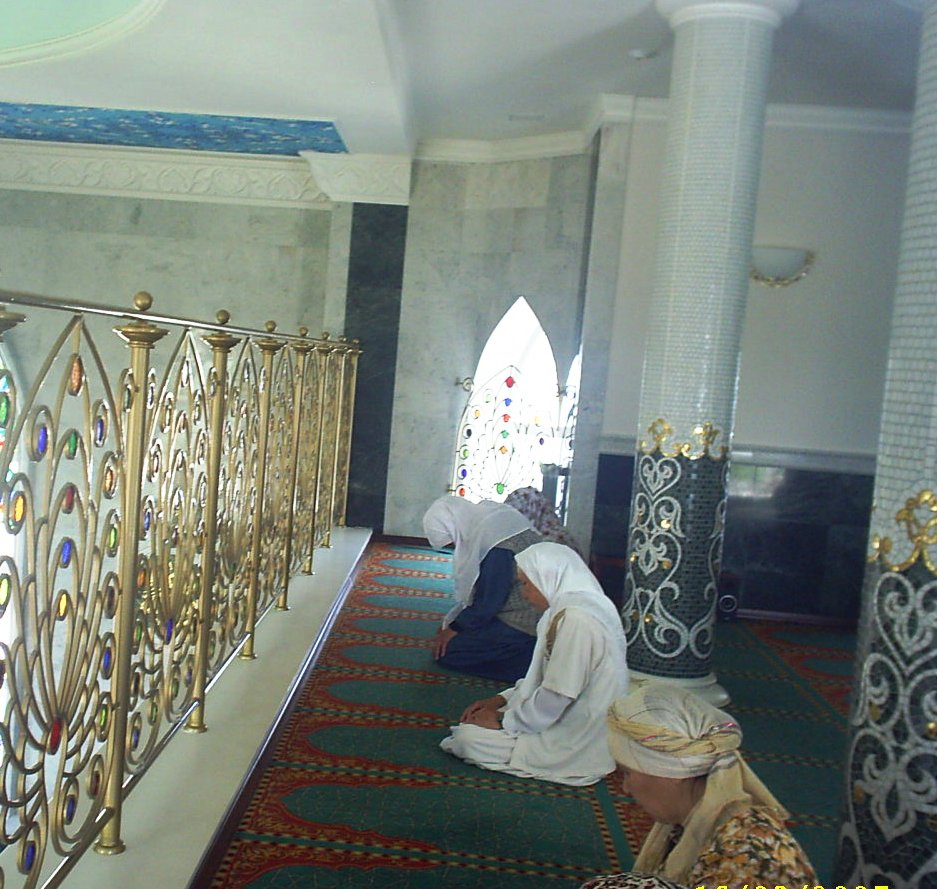
The female area

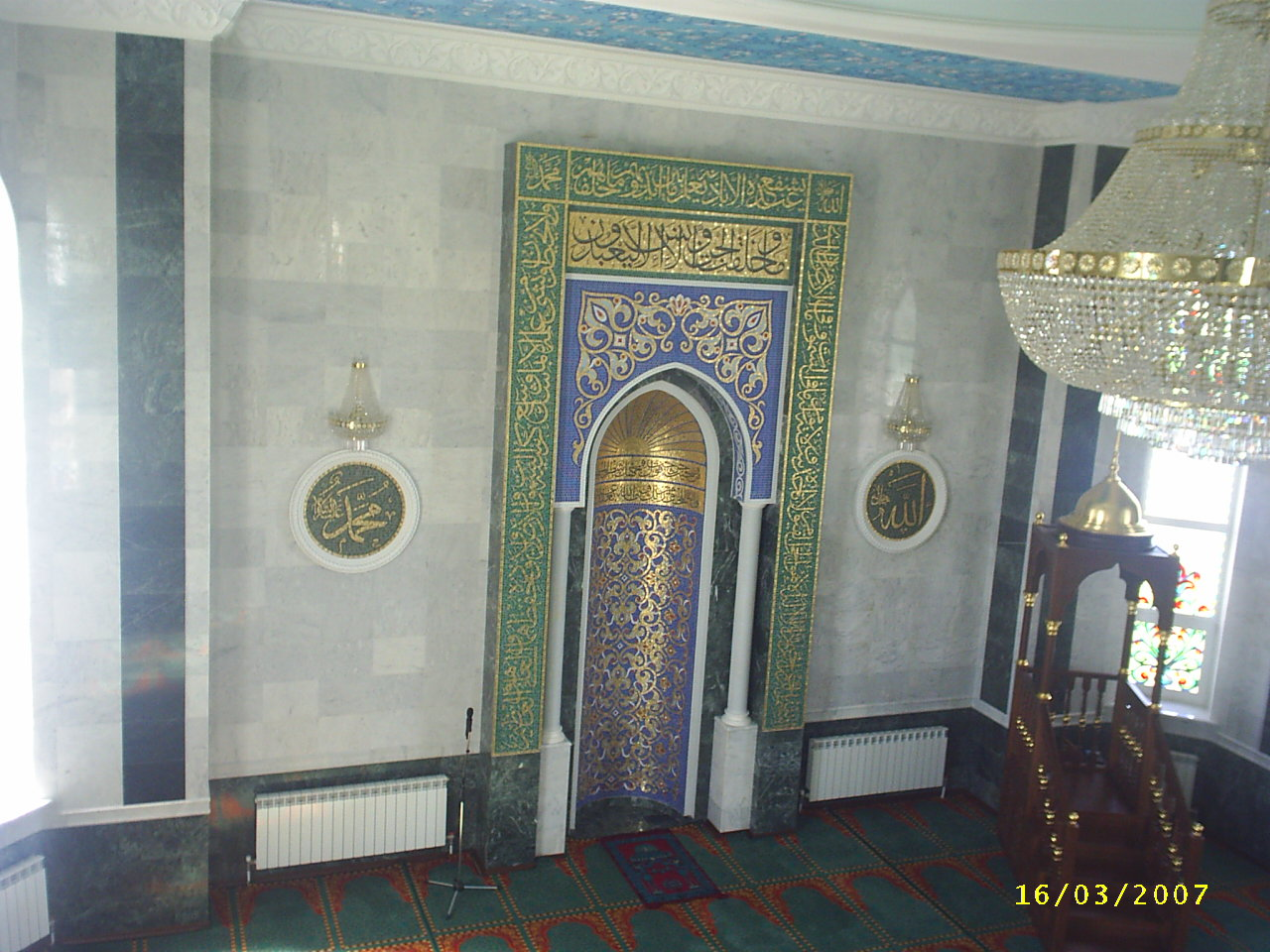
Pulpit

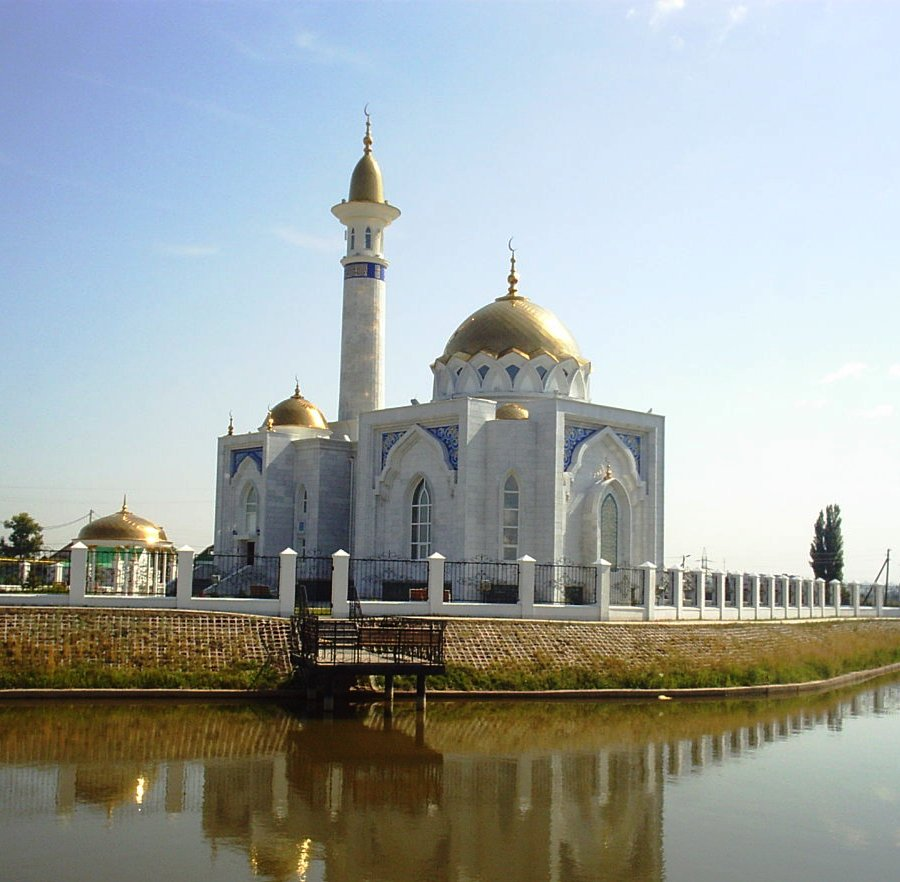
The mosque from the side

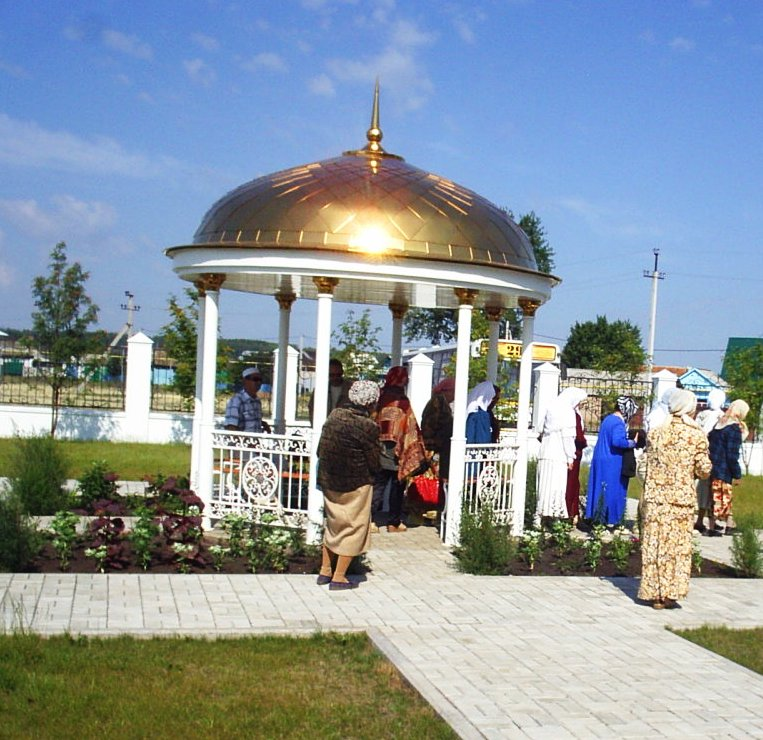
Mosque courtyard
