= Perm Mosque =

Mosque in Perm, Perm Krai, Russia

- Пермская соборная мечеть
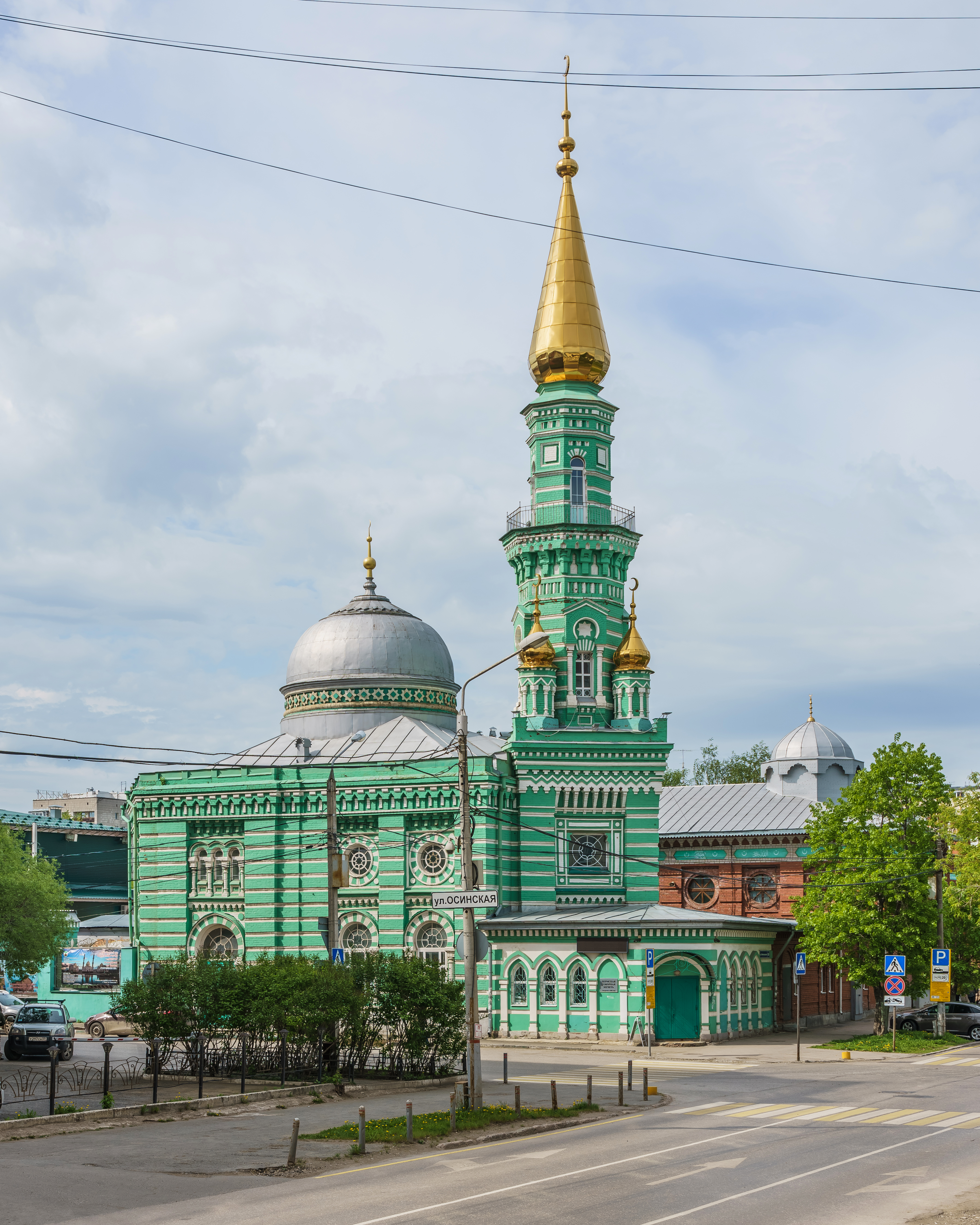

Religion
- Affiliation: Islam

Location
- Municipality: Perm
- State: Perm Krai
- Country: Russia
- Interactive map of Perm Mosque
- Coordinates: 58.014088°N 56.227608°E

Architecture
- Architect: Alexander Ozhegov
- Type: mosque
- Established: 1902-1903

Specifications
- Dome: 1
- Minaret: 1

Website
- islam-perm.ru

The Perm Central Mosque (Russian: Пермская соборная мечеть) was built in 1902 and 1903 in the Tatar district of Perm, Perm Krai, Russia. Its construction was financed by the local Tatar merchant families. The striped green-and-white building with a tapering minaret was designed by Alexander Ozhegov. For some years it was the northernmost mosque in the world until superseded by the Nord Kamal Mosque in Norilsk.

After the Russian Revolution the mosque was shut down. The building was used for storing the Communist Party archives between 1940 and 1986. Religious activities in the mosque were resumed in 1990s.

== See also ==
- Islam in Russia
- List of mosques in Russia
- List of mosques in Europe
