= Bornay Mosque =

Mosque in Kazan, Tatarstan, Russia

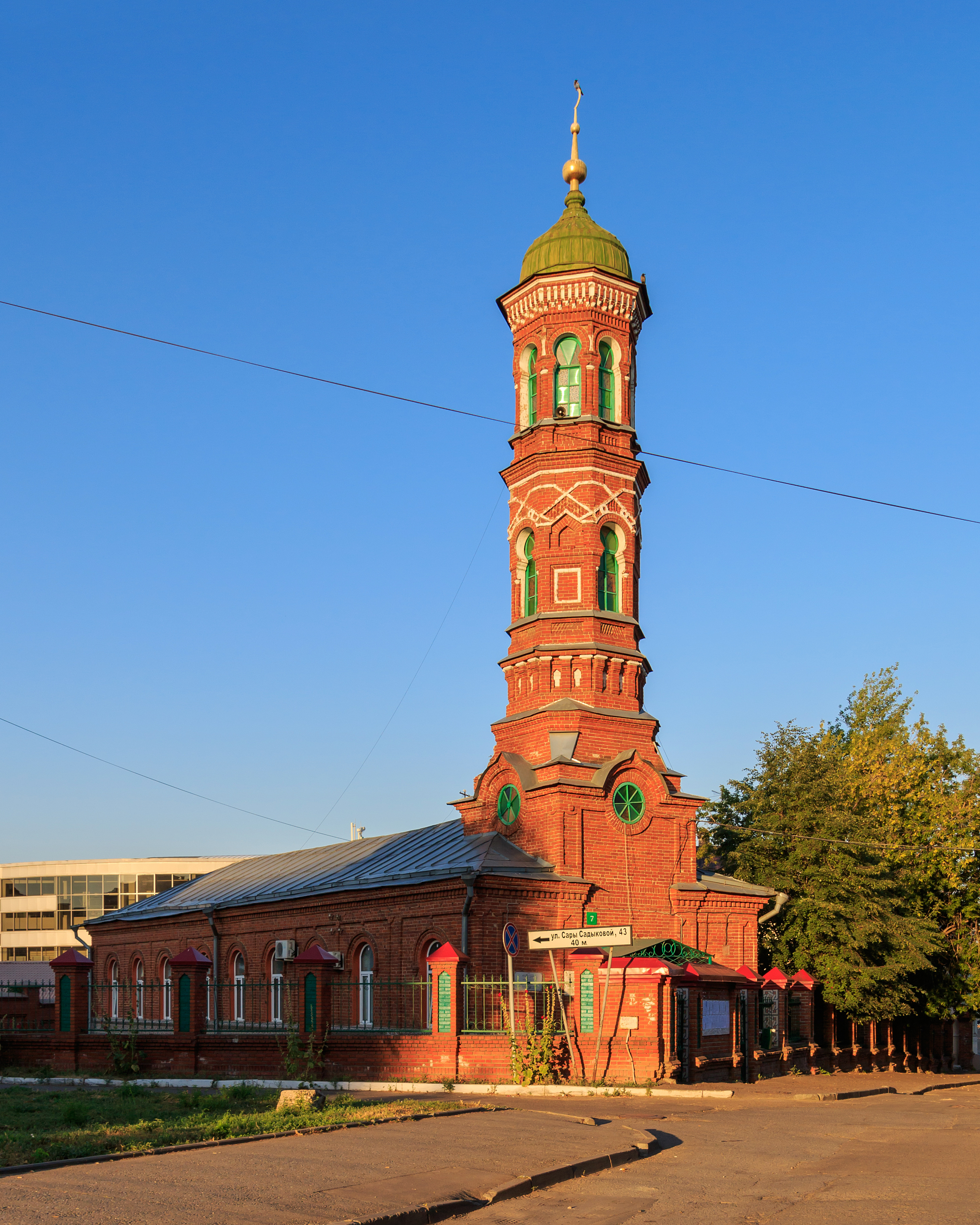

Religion
- Affiliation: Islam
- District: Tatarstan
- Status: Active

Location
- Location: Kazan, Russia
- Interactive map of Bornay Mosque
- Coordinates: 55°46′29″N 49°07′01″E

Architecture
- Architect: Pyotr Ivanovich Romanov
- Type: Mosque
- Style: National Romance Eclecticism
- Completed: 1872

Specifications
- Minaret: 1
- Materials: Red brick

The Bornay Mosque (Cyrillic: Bornay məçete, Борнай мәчете; former The Third Cathedral Mosque), also spelled Burnayevskaya Mosque (Russian: Бурна́евская мечеть) is a mosque in Kazan, Tatarstan, Russia.

== History ==
Its constructing was donated by Möxämmätsadíq Bornayıv and realized by project of Pyotr Ivanovich Romanov in 1872. The architectural style is national romance eclecticism. The minaret was built in 1895. Believed, that the project of the minaret was elaborated by Fyodor Nikolayevich Malinovsky. The mosque has a minaret over the door, one hall, it is one-storied and is made of red bricks. The interior is designed in the medieval Tatar and Russian traditions. In 1930-1994 Bornay Mosque was out of service due to the Soviet authorities and in 1994 it was returned to the believers.

== See also ==
- Islam in Tatarstan
- Islam in Russia
- List of mosques in Russia
- List of mosques in Europe
