= Moscow Cathedral Mosque =

Mosque in Moscow, Russia

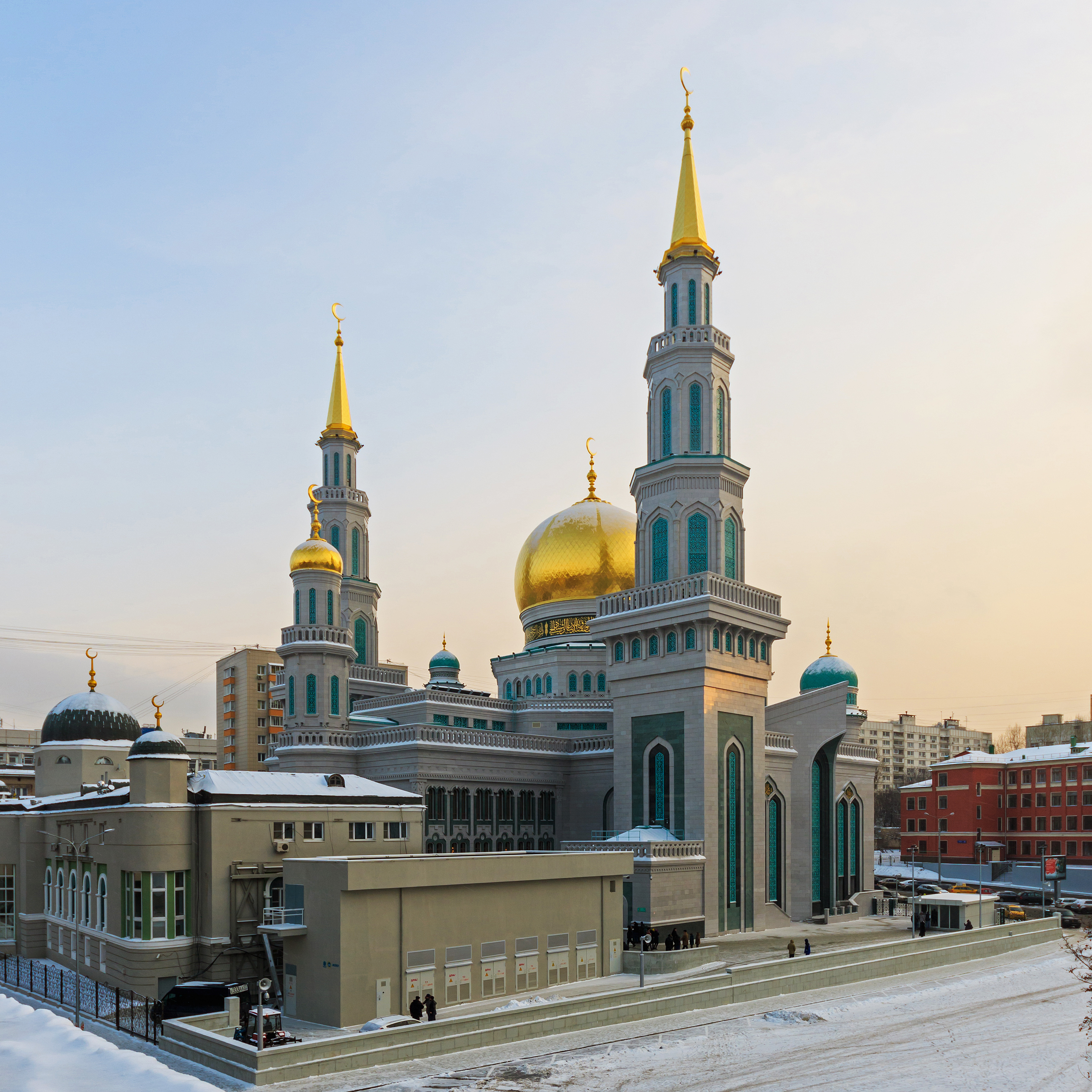
- The mosque in 2016

Religion
- Affiliation: Sunni Islam, Hanafi
- Status: Active

Location
- Location: Moscow, Russia
- Interactive map of Moscow Cathedral Mosque
- Coordinates: 55°46′45″N 37°37′37″E

Architecture
- Architect: Nikolay Zhukov
- Type: Congregational mosque
- Style: Architecture of the Kazan Khanate
- Completed: 1904; 122 years ago (old structure); 2015; 11 years ago (current structure)
- Capacity: 10,000

Website
- http://www.mihrab.ru/

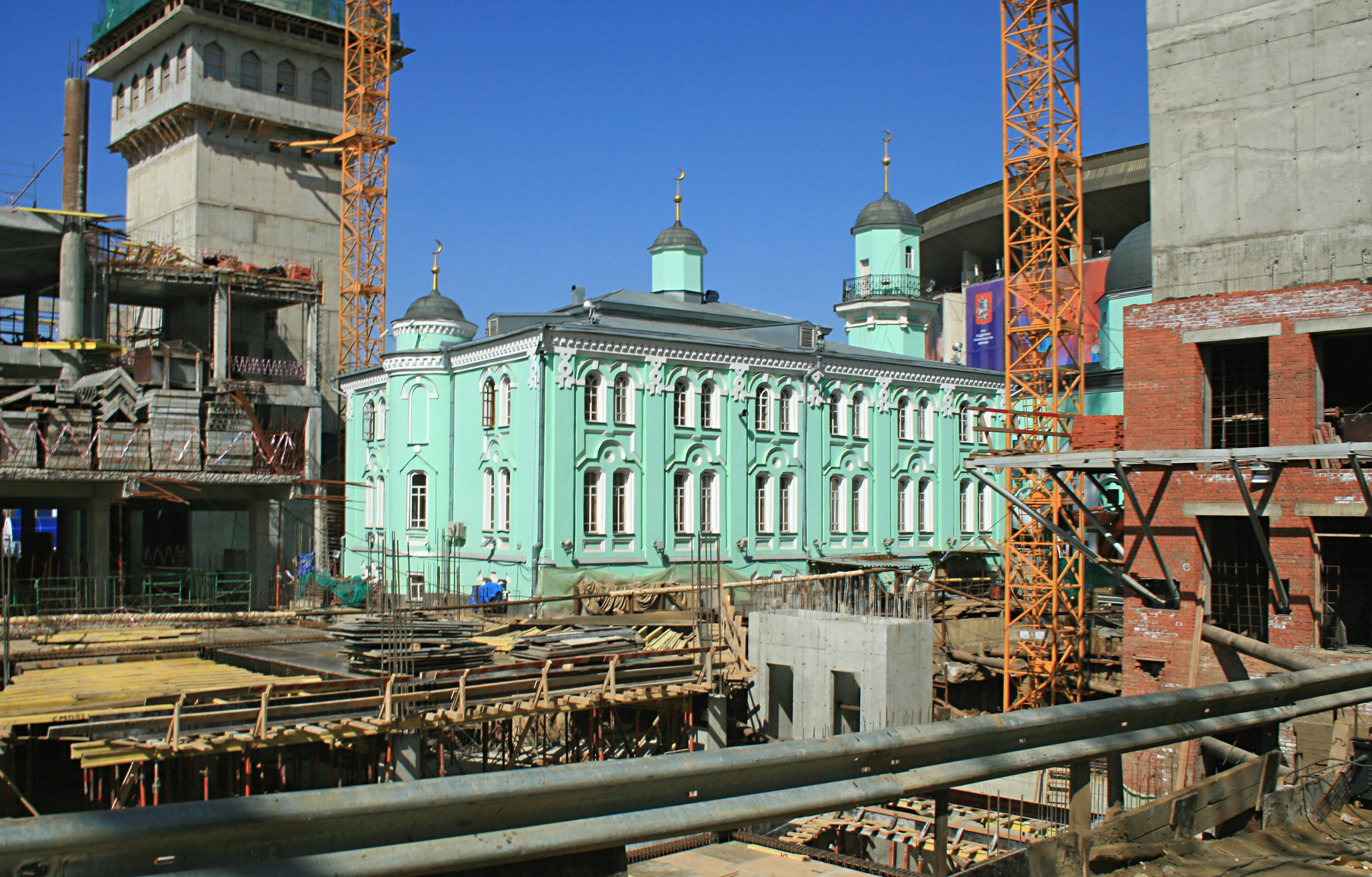
The historic Cathedral Mosque surrounded by the construction site of the new mosque (2009)

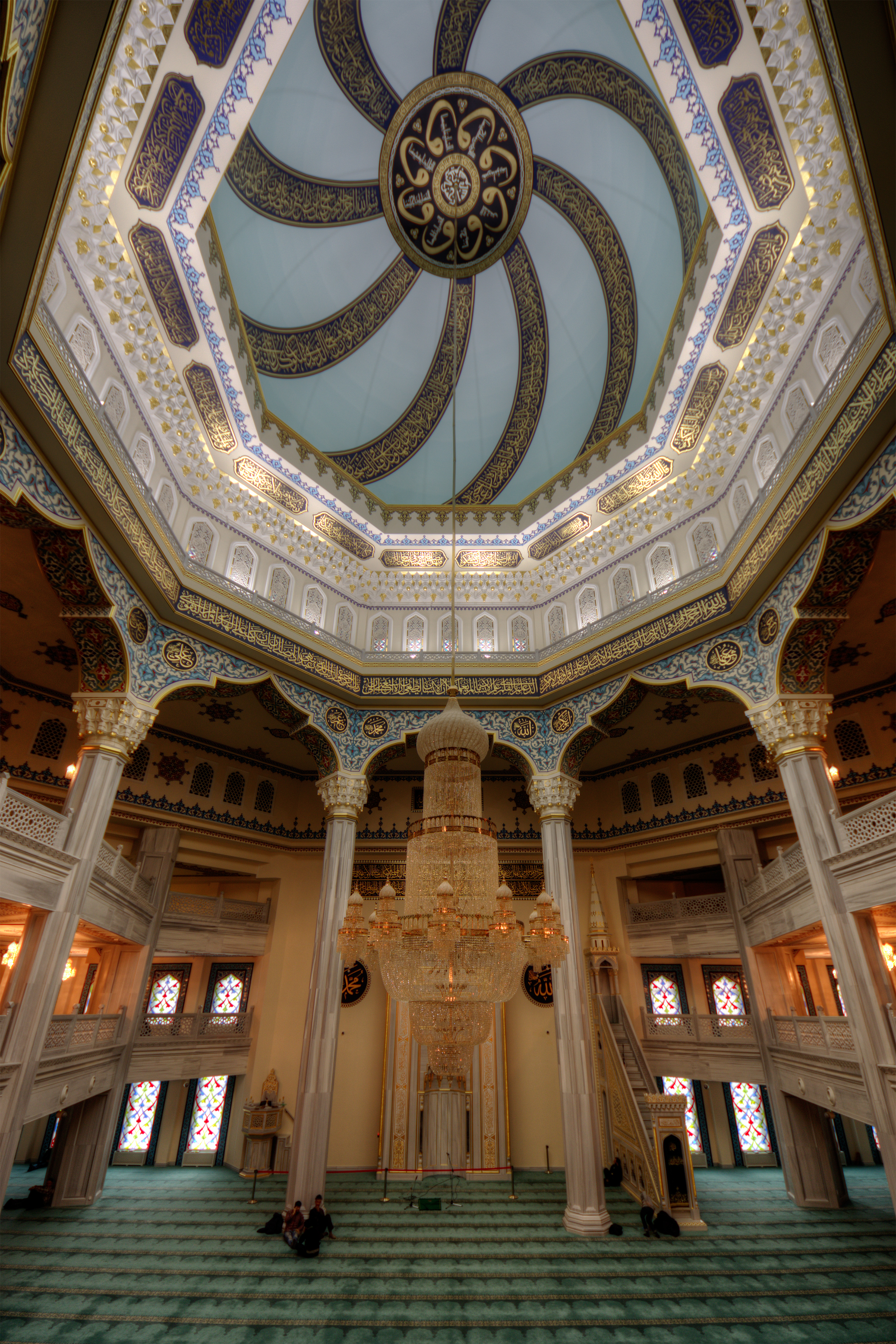
Central hall with a dome

Moscow Cathedral Mosque (Russian: Московская соборная мечеть, Moskovskaya sobornaya mechet) is the main mosque of Moscow, Russia. It is located on Olimpiysky Avenue, close to the Olympic Stadium in the centre of the city.

== History ==
The original structure was built in 1904 according to the design of the architect Nikolay Zhukov and has undergone some reconstructions since then. It was also sometimes called "Tatar Mosque" because its congregation consisted mainly of ethnic Tatars. Socially, the Moscow Congregational Mosque was often viewed as the central mosque in Russia. It was one of the four mosques in Moscow.

The old mosque was demolished on 11 September 2011. The decision to demolish it was controversial. In June 2008, the mosque was recognized as an object of cultural heritage, however, towards the end of 2008 it was removed from the list of historical and architectural monuments. Thus, at the time of demolition, it was not protected. There were plans to reconstruct the mosque, and the reconstruction project was designed by architect Ilyas Tazhiyev. One of the reasons for reconstruction was that the building deviated by several degrees from the direction to Mecca. The project included disassembling the mosque, collecting all the stones, and re-assembling it again with corrected orientation. In 2009, however, the Council of Muftis dismissed Tazhiyev, first claiming they will make another reconstruction project, and then demolishing the building claiming it was close to collapse. Tazhiyev stated after the demolition that the reconstruction was still possible, and the building was not close to collapse.

The Moscow Cathedral Mosque became the first demolished religious building in Moscow since 1978.

== New mosque ==
A new mosque has been built at the site of the former one. It was officially inaugurated on 23 September 2015. The new mosque has the capacity of ten thousand worshippers. Presidents Vladimir Putin of Russia, Recep Tayyip Erdoğan of Turkey and Mahmoud Abbas of Palestine together with local Muslim leaders participated in the inauguration ceremony of this mosque.

== See also ==
- Islam in Russia
- List of mosques in Russia
- List of mosques in Europe
