= Old Mosque, Moscow =

Mosque in Moscow, Russia

Old Mosque
- Московская историческая мечеть
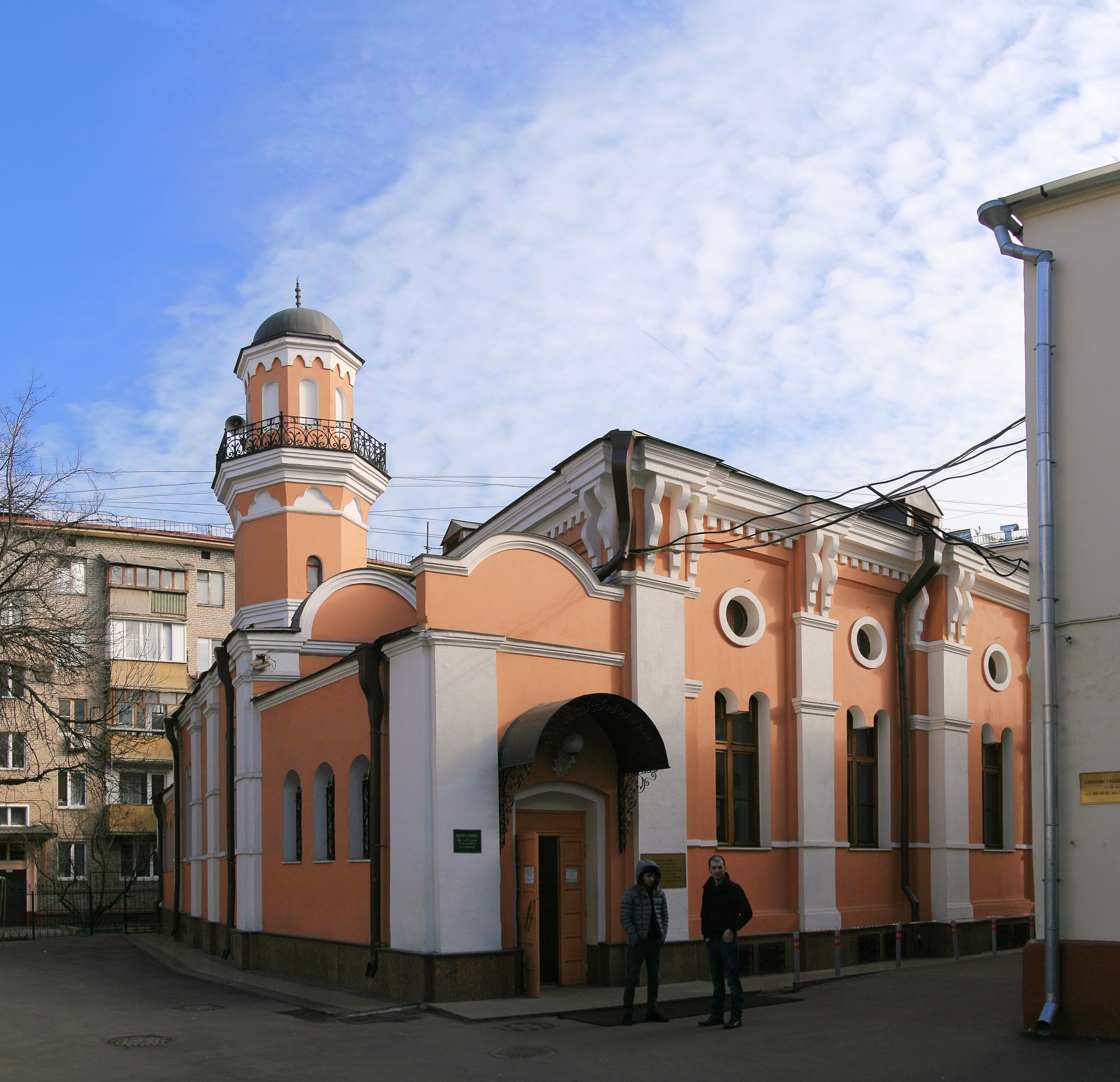

- Location within Moscow

Location
- Location: Moscow, Russia
- Coordinates: 55°44′20″N 37°37′57″E

Architecture
- Type: Mosque

The Old Mosque of Moscow (Russian: Московская историческая мечеть, Moskovskaya istoricheskaya mechet) was built in 1823 to replace an earlier private mosque that had been destroyed by the 1812 fire. Its location is Bolshaya Tatarskaya Street in Zamoskvorechye, a neighbourhood formerly settled by the Tatars.

The land was owned by a Tatar merchant, Nasarbai Hashalov. The tsarist authorities permitted the construction of a "Muslim house of prayer" on condition that it would not be called a mosque and that its facade would not differ significantly from neighbouring houses. The cupola and minaret were added in 1880. The madrasa dates from 1915.

The mosque was shut down by the Soviets in 1939 and the minaret was demolished in 1967. The last imam was purged in 1936 and later shot. Worship in the mosque did not resume until 1993. The minaret has been rebuilt in 1992.

== See also ==
- Islam in Russia
- List of mosques in Russia
- List of mosques in Europe
