= Nurulla Mosque =

Mosque in Kazan, Tatarstan, Russia

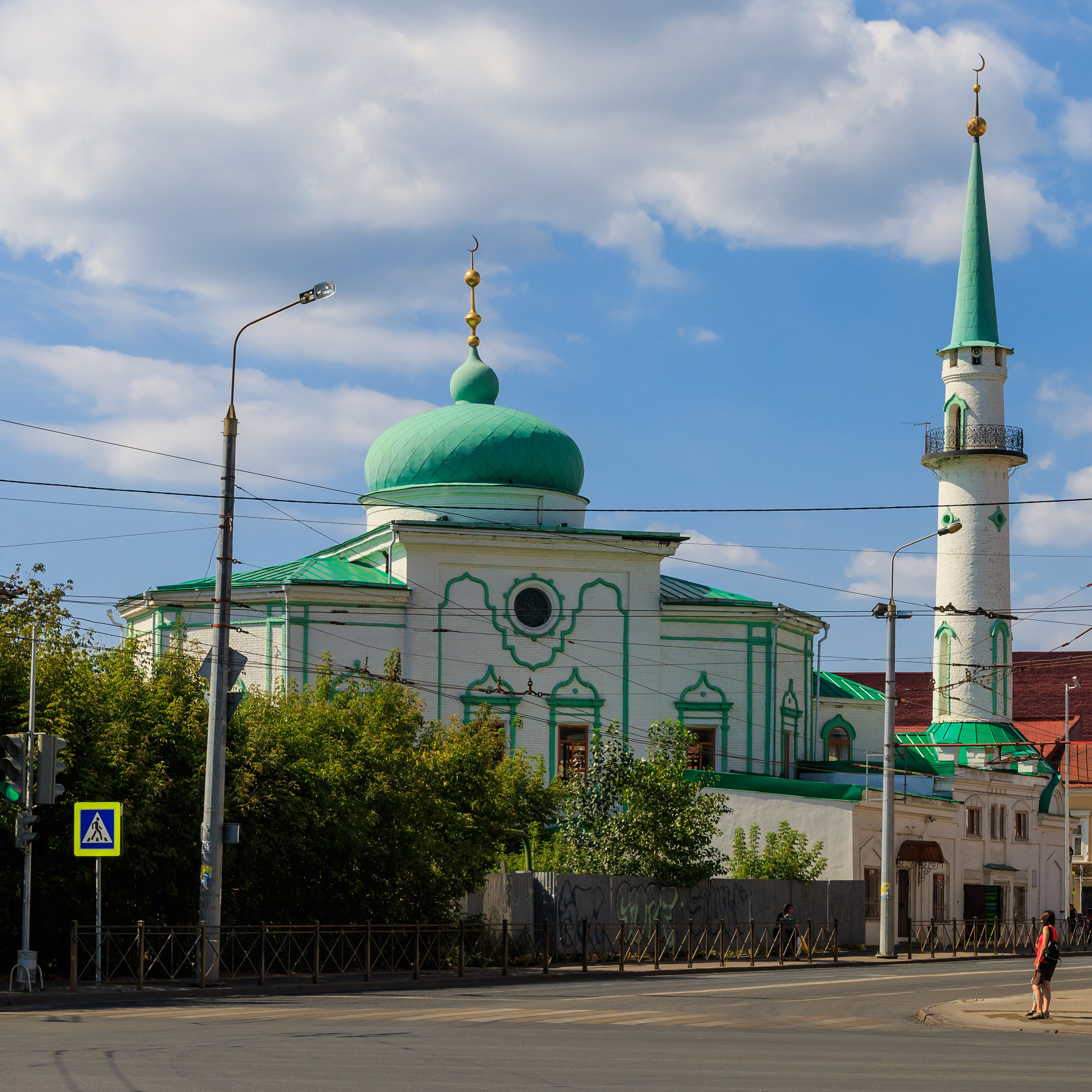

Religion
- Affiliation: Islam
- District: Tatarstan
- Status: Active

Location
- Location: Kazan, Russia
- Interactive map of Nurulla Mosque
- Coordinates: 55.7829°N 49.11455°E

Architecture
- Architect: A. K. Loman
- Type: Mosque
- Completed: 1849

Specifications
- Dome: 1
- Minaret: 1

The Nurulla Mosque (also spelled Nurullah; Cyrillic: Нурулла́; formerly The Seventh Cathedral Mosque, Hay Bazaar Mosque: Tatar: Печән Базары мәчете, romanized: Peçän Bazarı mäçete; Russian: Сенная мечеть/Sennaya, Bazaar Mosque, Yunıs Mosque, The Main Mosque, The White Mosque etc.) is a mosque in Kazan, Russia.

== History ==
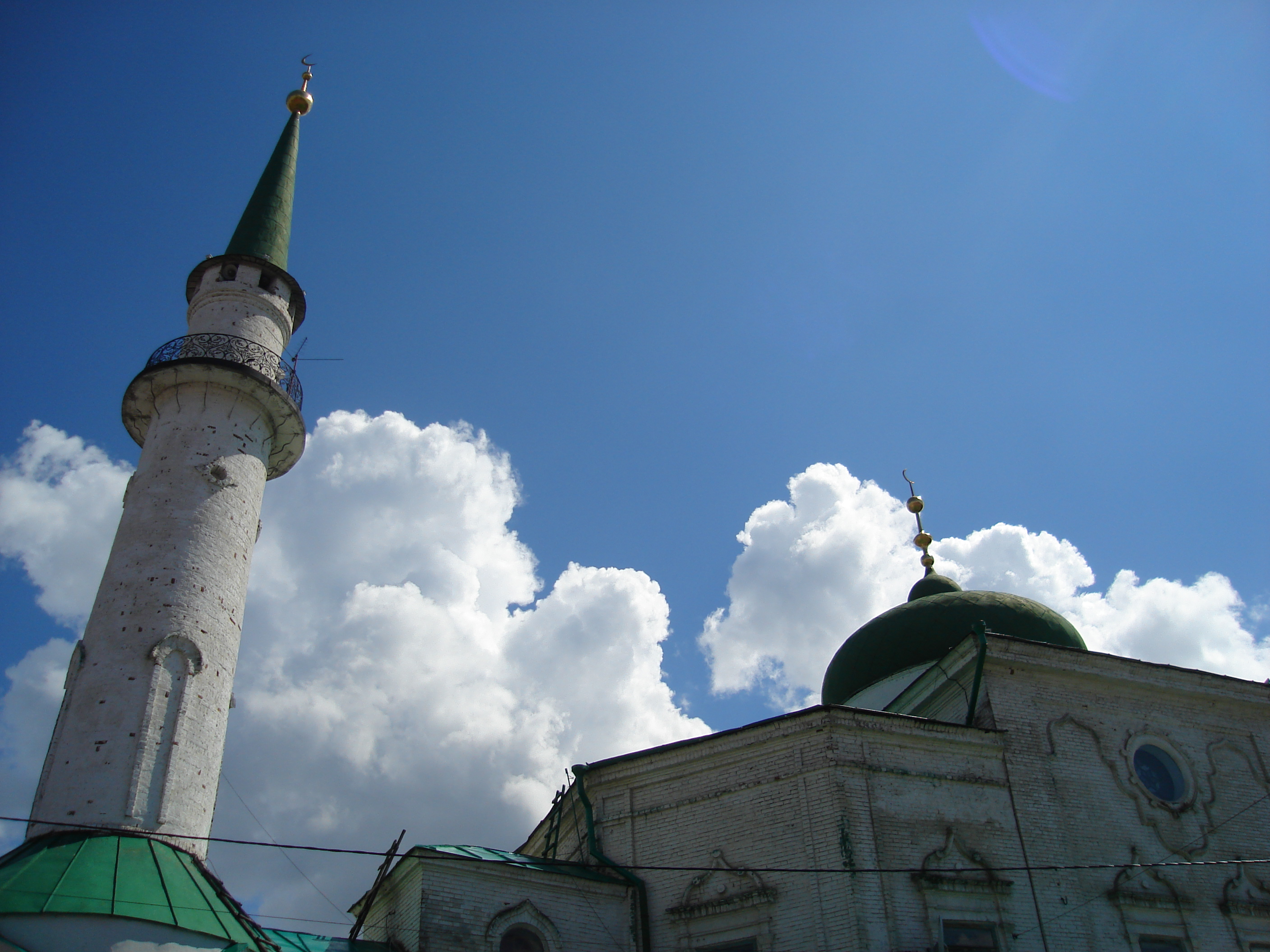
Nurulla Mosque's minaret and cupola

It was built in 1845–1849 on the donations of merchant Ğ. M. Yunısov by the project of A. K. Loman. The mosque is two-storied, has a hall with cupola and three-storied cylindrical minaret over the southern entry. The ornament of the mosque is similar to those of medieval Volga Bulgaria and the Middle East. In 1929 the minaret was destroyed, and till 1992 the mosque was used for apartments and offices. In 1992 it was renamed Nurullah and returned to believers. In 1990-1995 the mosque saw a restoration under R. W. Bilalov when the minaret also was restored.

== See also ==
- Islam in Tatarstan
- Islam in Russia
- List of mosques in Russia
- List of mosques in Europe
