= Old Mosque, Ufa =

Mosque in Ufa, Bashkortostan, Russia

Coordinates: 54.7147°N 55.9494°E

Tukayev Mosque
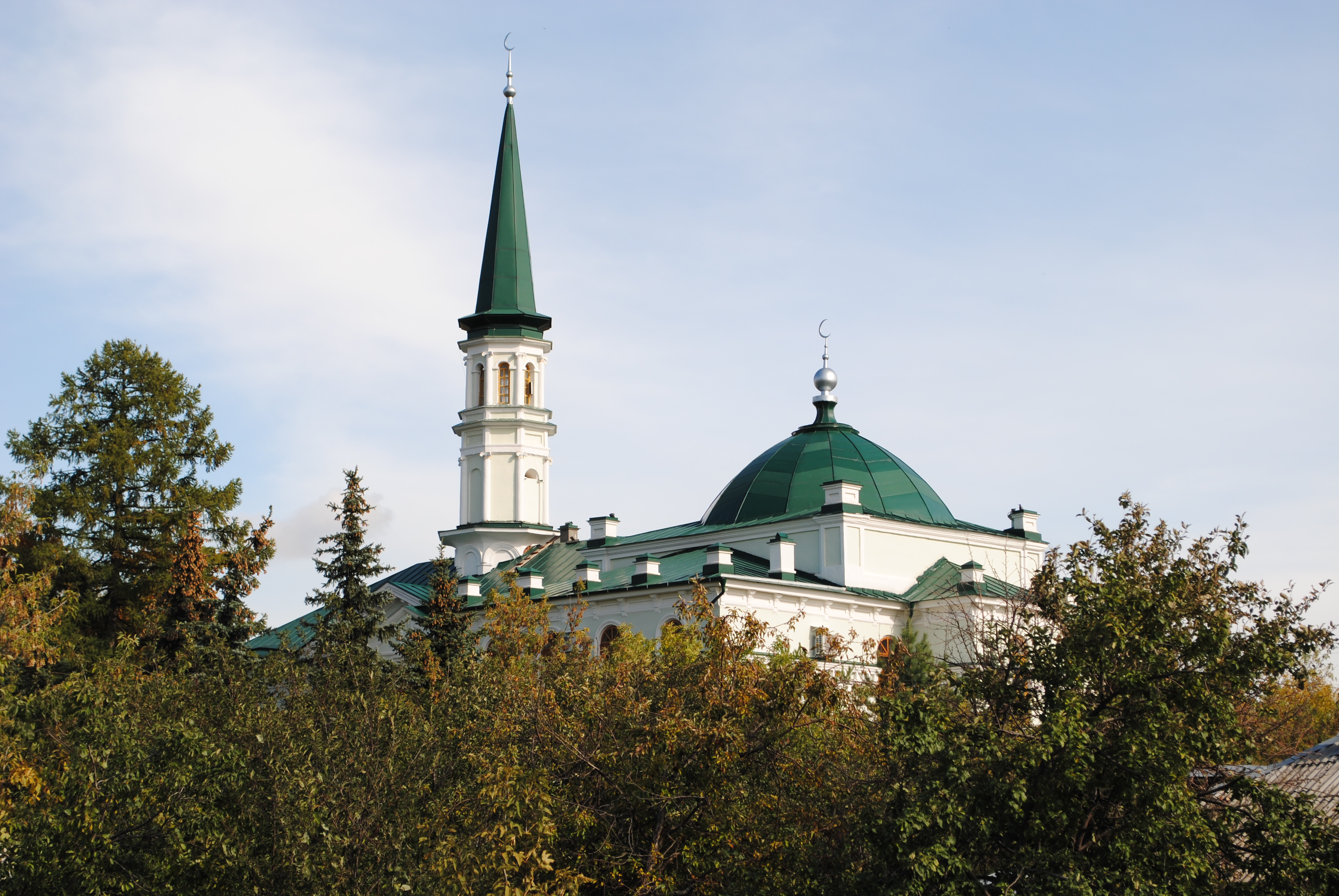

Religion
- Affiliation: Islam

Location
- Location: Ufa, Bashkortostan, Russia
- Interactive map of Tukayev Mosque

Architecture
- Type: Mosque
- Established: 1830
- Minaret: 1

The Old Mosque, Ufa (Russian: Первая соборная мечеть, Bashkir: Беренсе йәмиғ мәсете), commonly known as the Tukayev Mosque, is located in Ufa, Bashkortostan, Russia.

== History ==
The construction started in 1827, it was initiated by Gabdesallam Gabdrakhimov (1765-1840), the second mufti of the Orenburg Muslim Spiritual Assembly.

The first permanent mosque in the city of Ufa was erected in 1830 on Frolovskaya Street (later renamed Tukayev Street).

A madrasah was opened in 1887.

Until 1920 the building was the main mosque in Russia.

It was the only active mosque in the city between 1960 and 1992.

The local imam Cihangir Abızgildin was arrested and executed by the NKVD in 1937.

== See also ==
- Islam in Russia
- List of mosques in Russia
- List of mosques in Europe
