= Kantyukovka =

Rural locality in Russia

Kantyukovka Кантюковка
- Selo
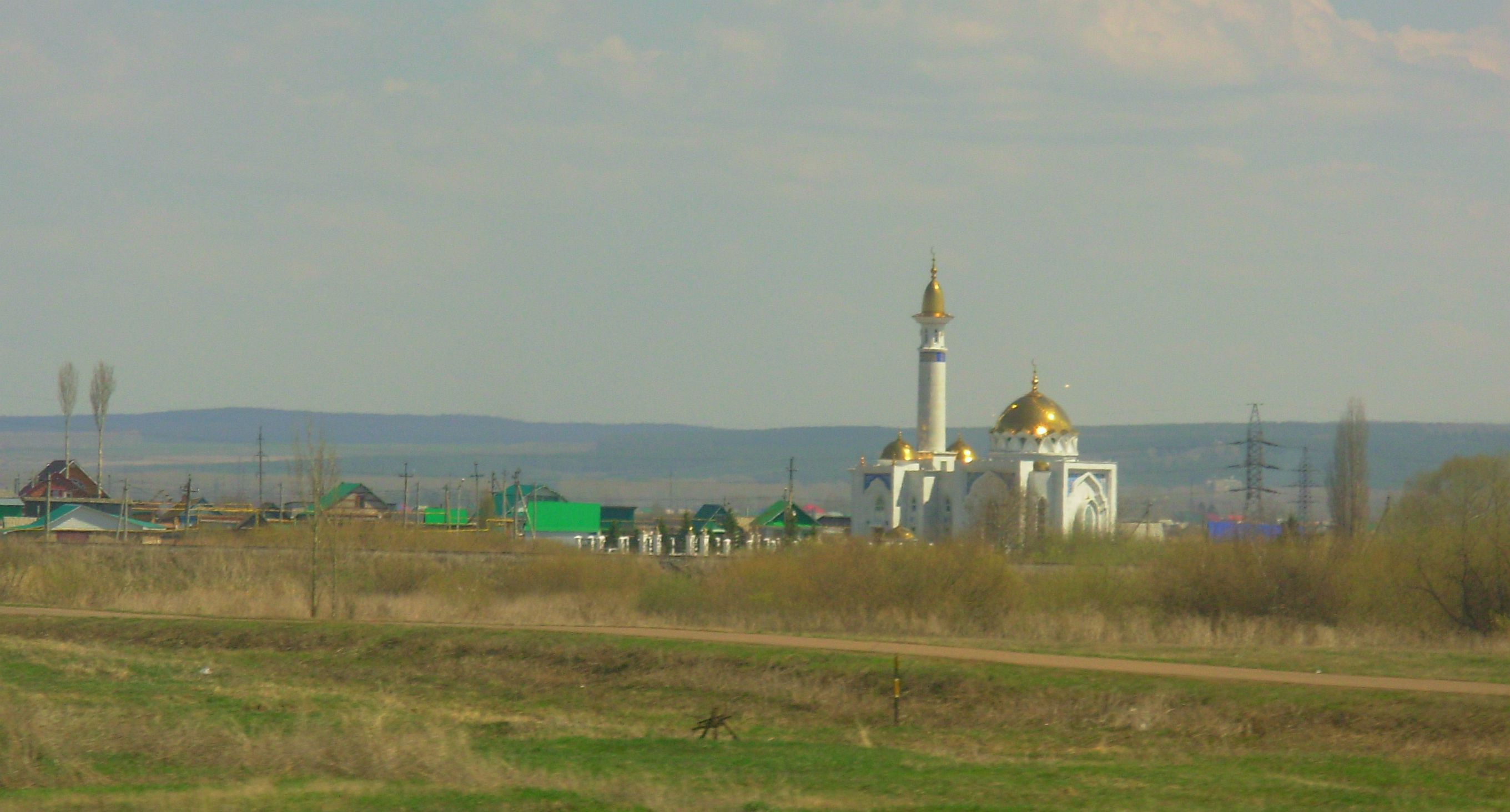

- Location within Bashkortostan Location within Russia
- Coordinates: 53°26′N 55°56′E
- Country: Russia
- Region: Bashkortostan
- District: Sterlitamaksky District
- Time zone: UTC+5:00

Kantyukovka (Russian: Кантюковка; Bashkir: Ҡантүк, Qantük) is a rural locality (a selo) in Naumovsky Selsoviet, Sterlitamaksky District, Bashkortostan, Russia. The population was 312 as of 2010. There are 6 streets.

== Geography ==
Kantyukovka is located 26 km south of Sterlitamak (the district's administrative centre) by road. Vasilyevka is the nearest rural locality.
