= Samara Mosque =

Mosque in Russia

- Самарская соборная мечеть
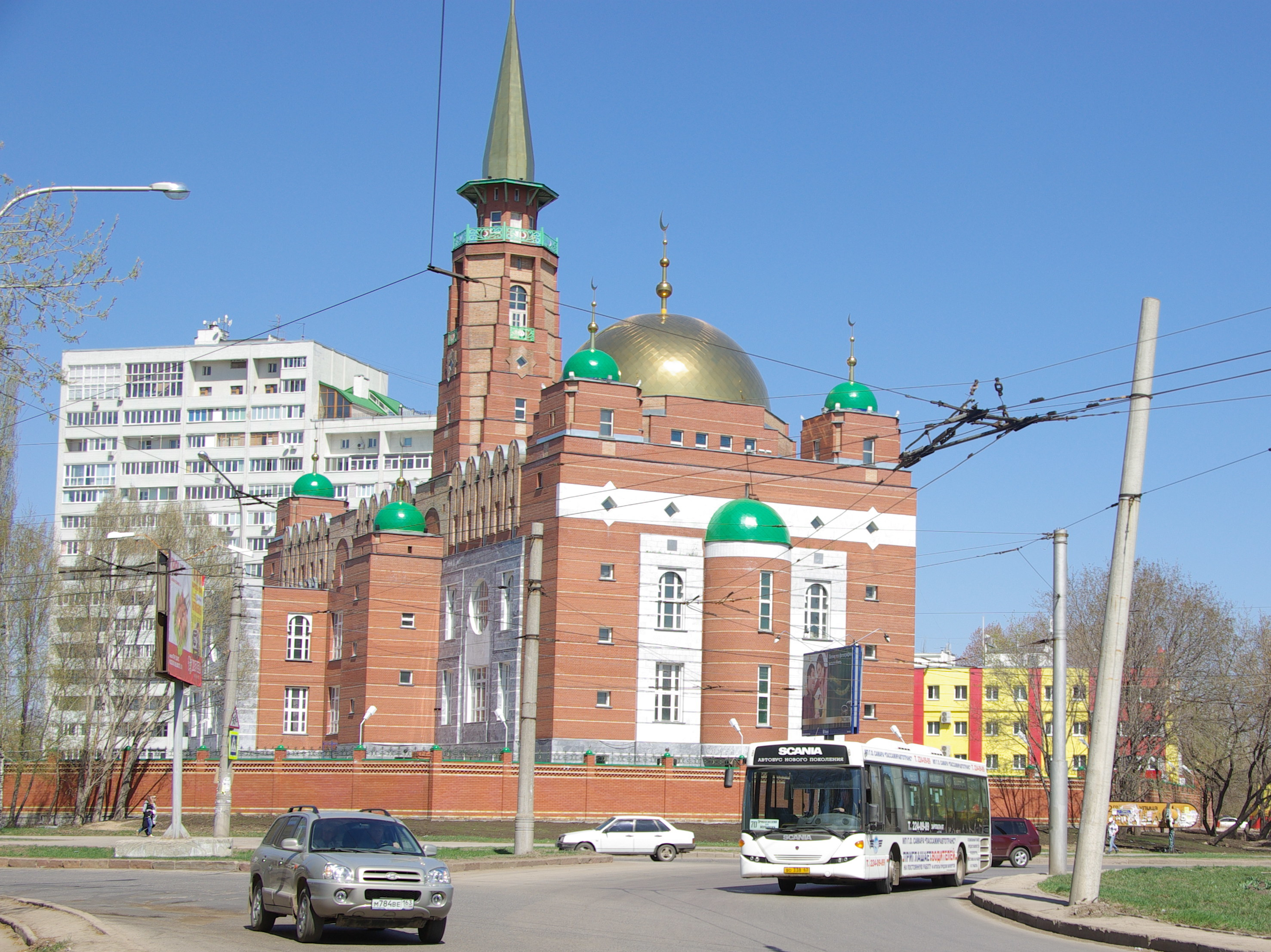

Religion
- Affiliation: Sunni Islam

Location
- Interactive map of Samara Mosque
- Coordinates: 53°13′47″N 50°12′26″E

Architecture
- Architect: Rasim Walshin
- Type: Mosque
- Established: 1990s

Specifications
- Dome: 1
- Dome dia. (outer): 13.5 meters
- Minaret: 1
- Minaret height: 67 meters

The Samara Mosque (Russian: Самарская соборная мечеть) in Samara is one of the largest mosques in Russia. It was built in the late 1990s in red brick. The main dome is 13.5 meters in diameter. The minaret rises to a height of 67 meters. The building was designed by Rasim Walshin, an architect from Samara. There is an apple orchard by the walls. The New Mosque should not be confused with the pre-revolutionary mosque dating back to 1891.

== See also ==
- Islam in Russia
- List of mosques in Russia
- List of mosques in Europe
