= Red Mosque (Tomsk) =

Mosque in Tomsk, Russia

- Красная мечеть
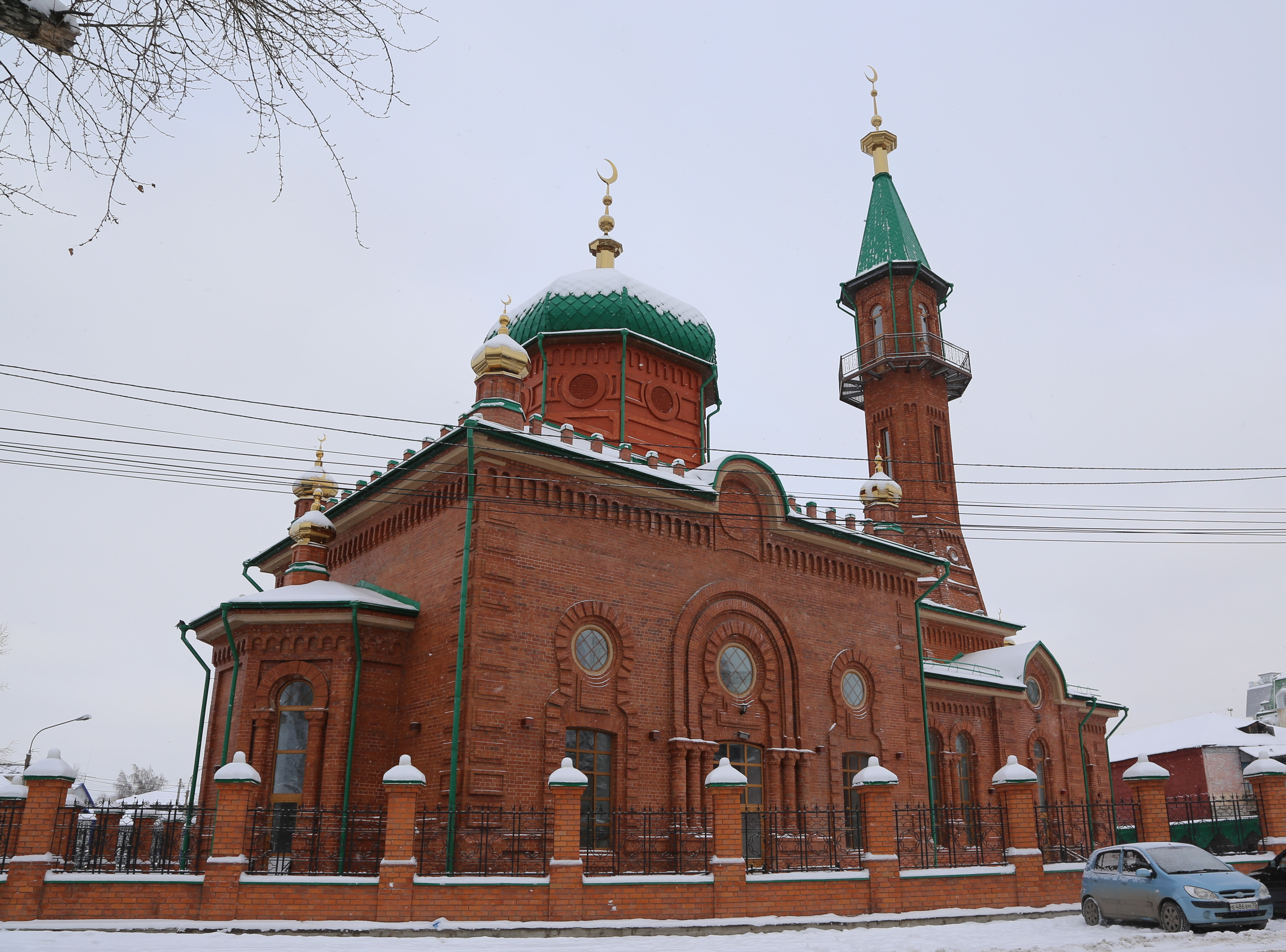

Religion
- Affiliation: Islam

Location
- Location: Tomsk, Tomsk Oblast
- Country: Russia
- Interactive map of Red Mosque

The Red Mosque (Russian: Кра́сная мече́ть) is a stone mosque in Tomsk, Russia.

== History ==
In 2014, with funds from representatives of Chechnya, the lost minaret and dome are being actively restored and rebuilt.

In December 2014, the restoration of the Red Mosque was completed.

== Gallery ==
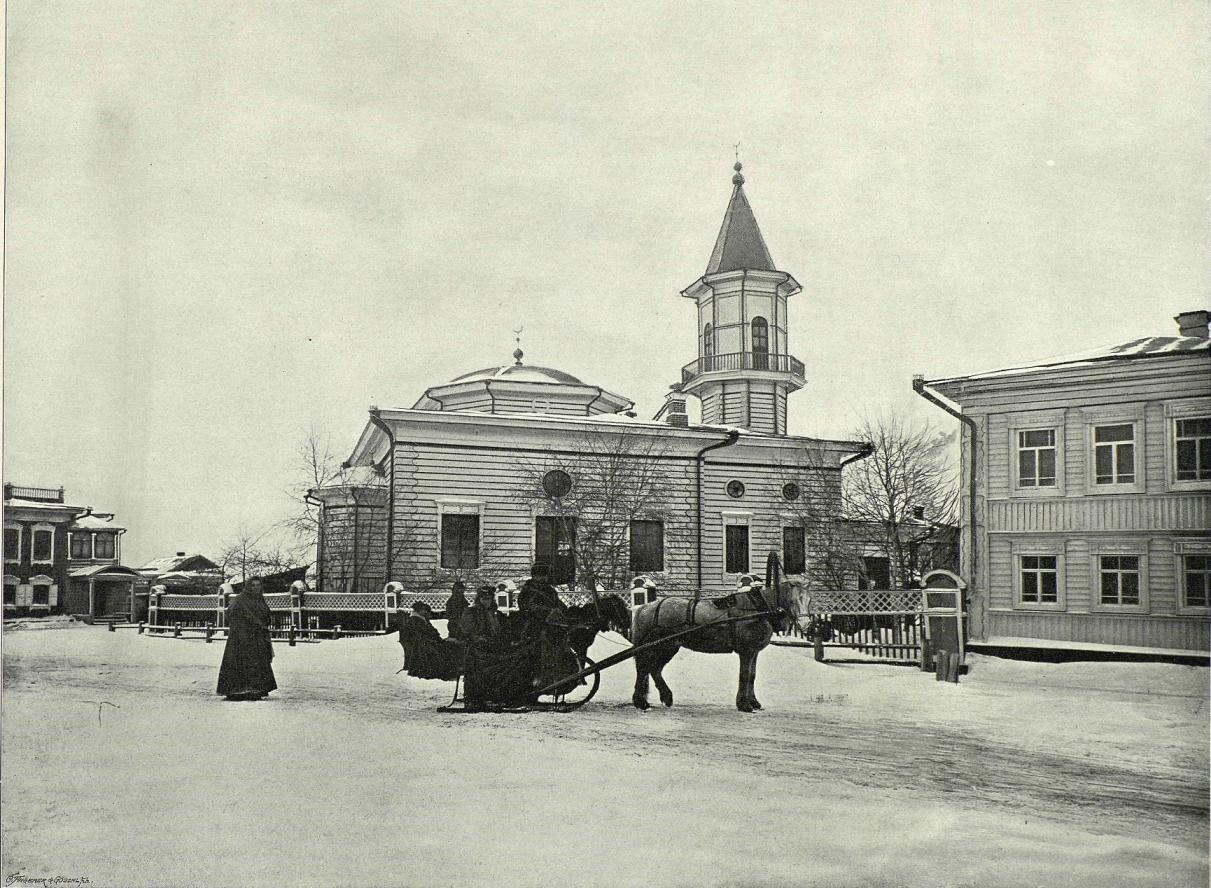
The previous mosque on the site, 1899

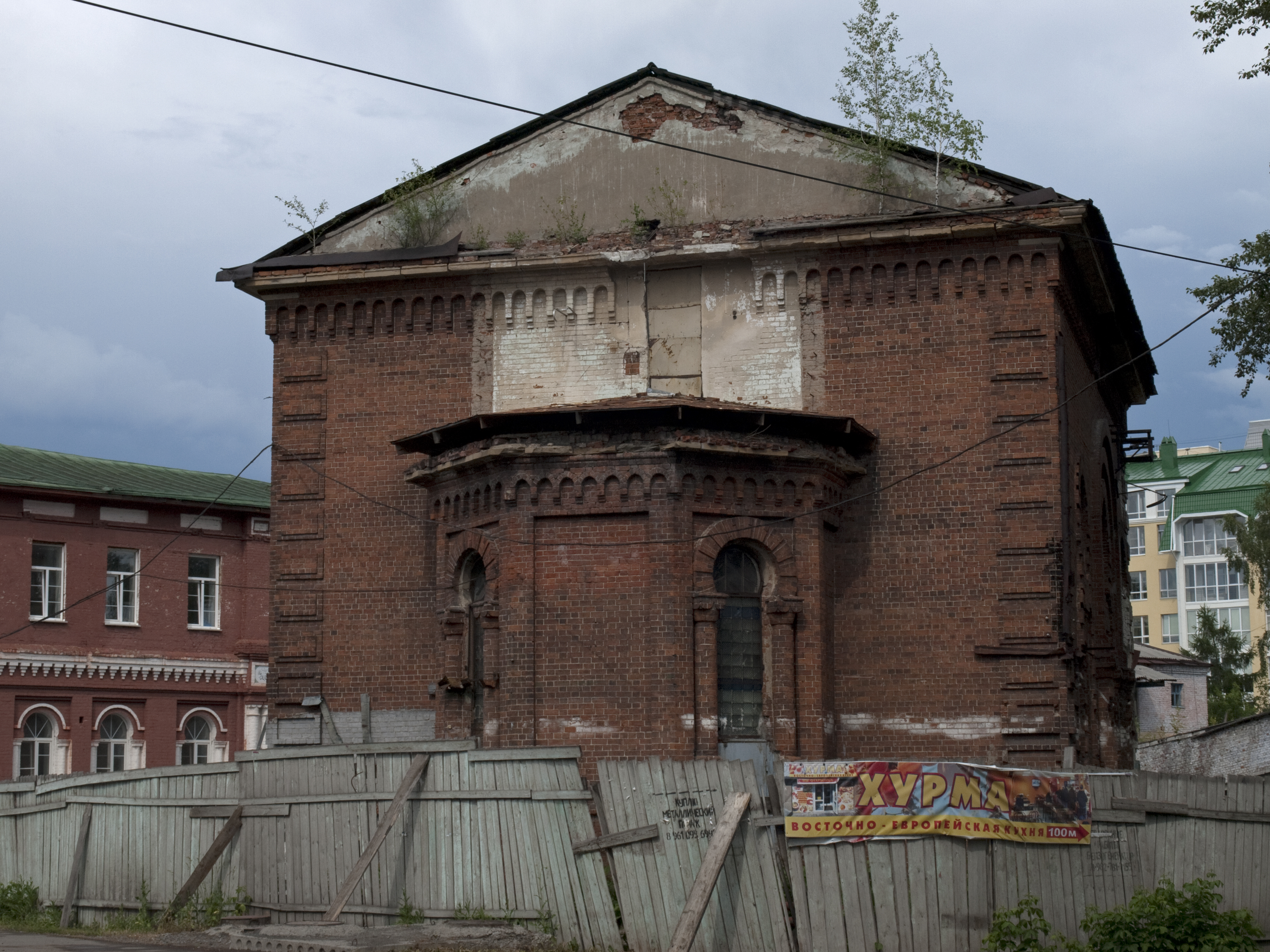
The mosque before reconstruction, 2011

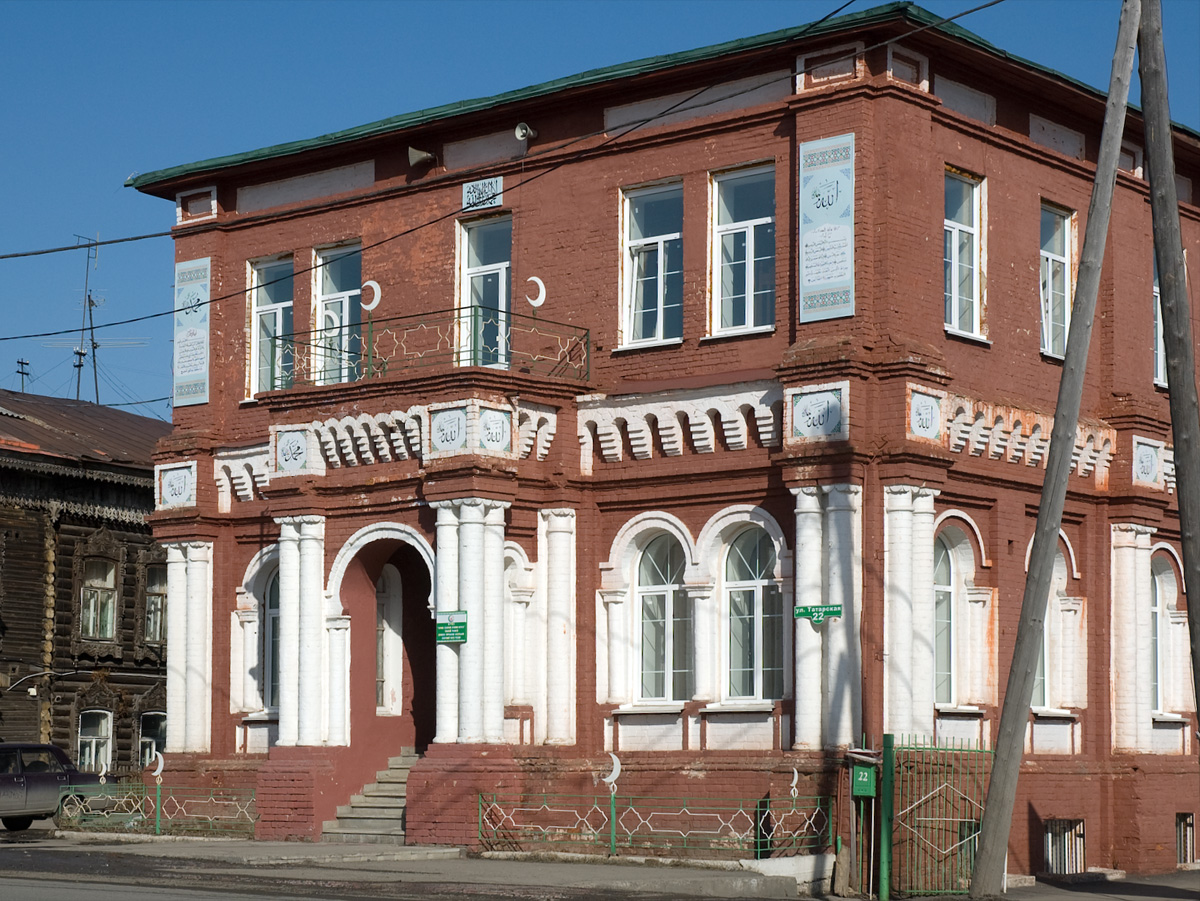
The building of the Khamitovsky Madrasah, 2014
