= Äcem Mosque =

Mosque in Kazan, Tatarstan, Russia

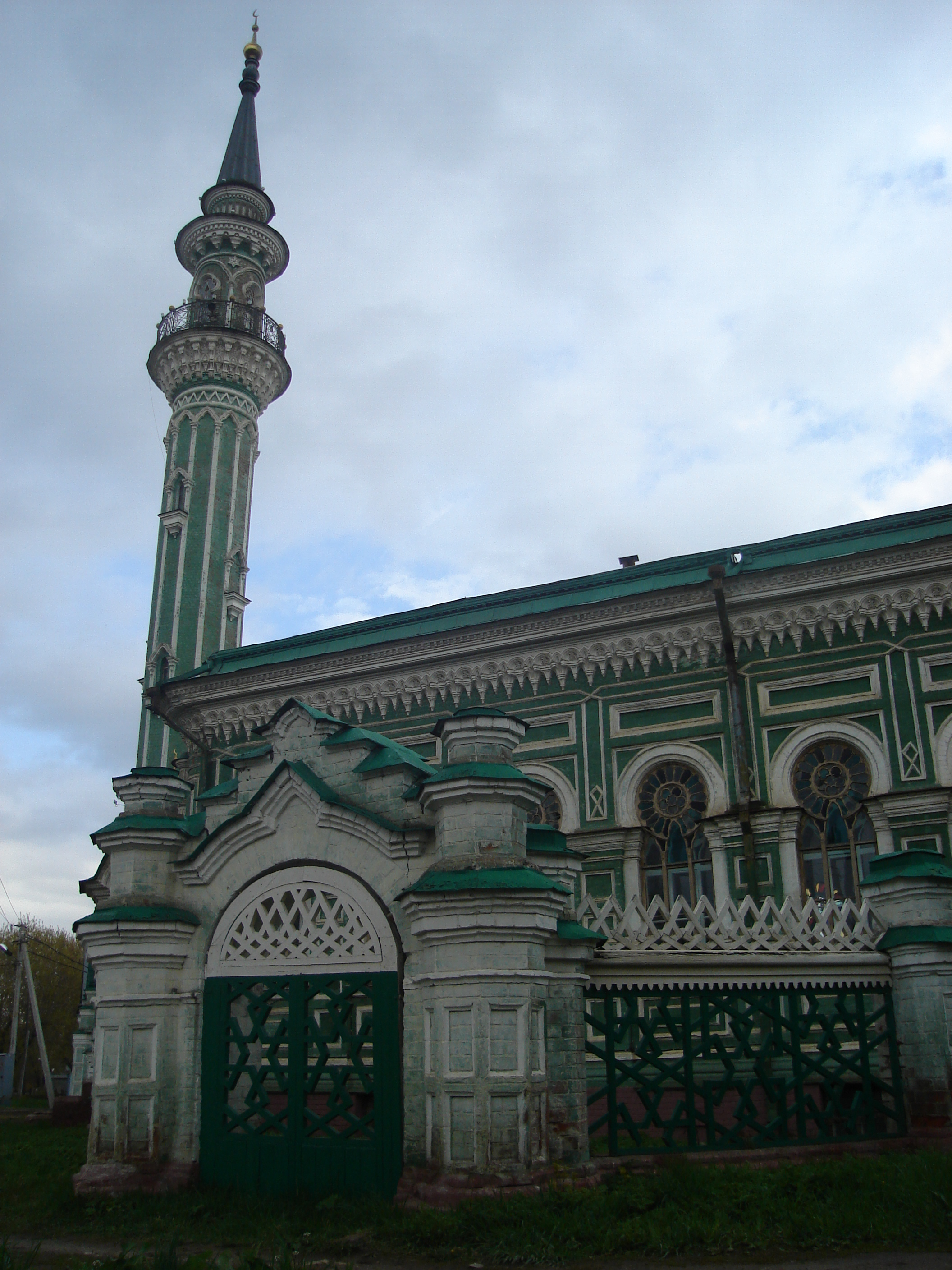

Religion
- Affiliation: Islam
- District: Tatarstan
- Status: Active

Location
- Location: Kazan, Russia
- Interactive map of Äcem Mosque
- Coordinates: 55°46′07″N 49°06′55″E

Architecture
- Type: Mosque
- Style: National Romance Eclecticism
- Completed: 1890

Specifications
- Minaret: 1
- Minaret height: 51 meters

Äcem Mosque (Tatar Cyrillic and Latin respectively: Әҗем мәчете or Äcem mäçete, pronounced [æˈʑem]); (Russian: Ази́мовская мече́ть, Azimovskaya mechet) is a prominent cathedral mosque in Kazan, Tatarstan, Russia. It is located in the southern part of the Old Tatar Quarter, a historic district populated by Tatars, and is one of about a dozen historical mosques in the district.

== History ==
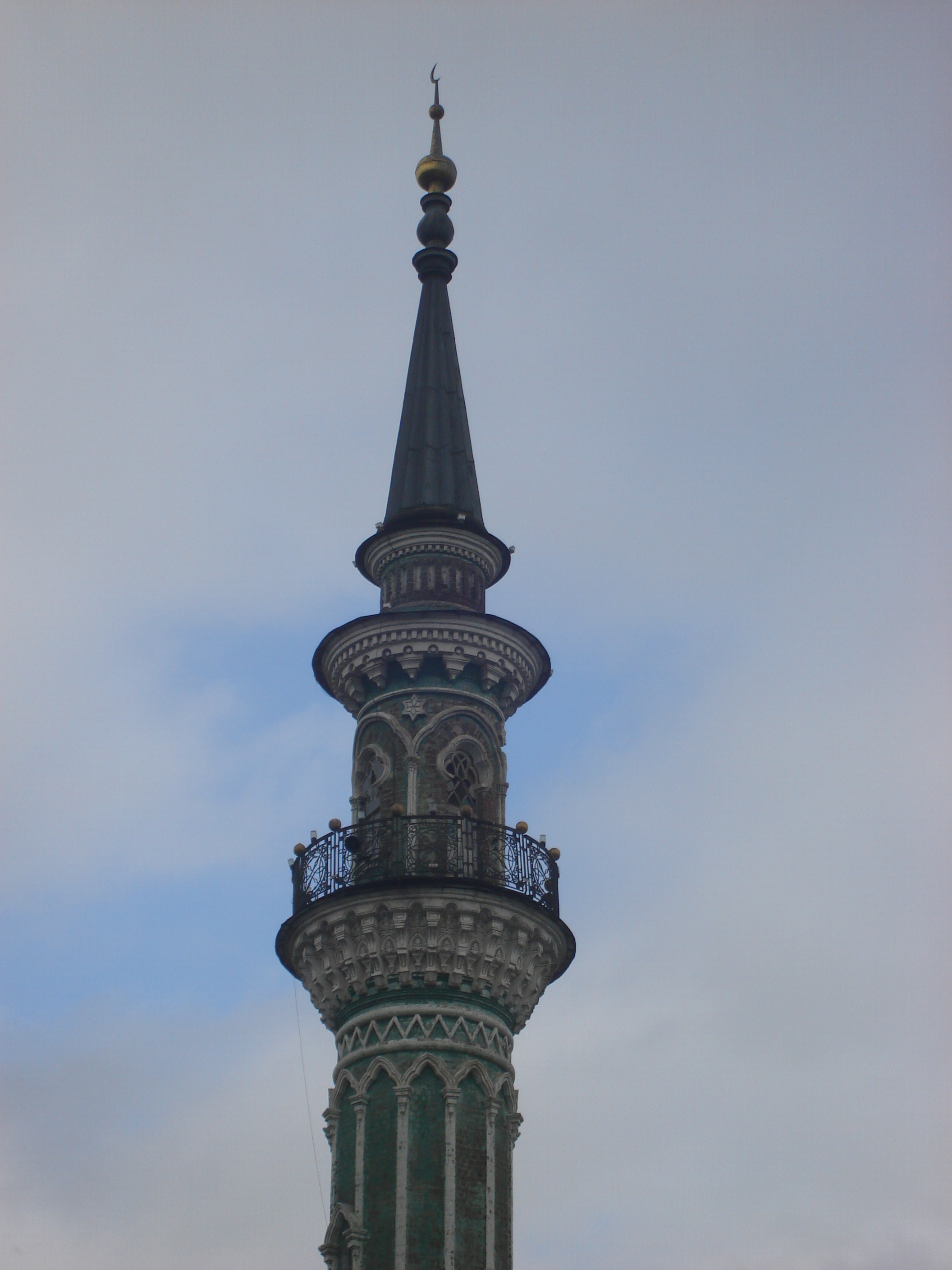
The minaret of Äcem Mosque

The construction of the mosque was sponsored by a wealthy Tatar merchant, Mortaza Äcimev, hence the name. The construction started in 1887 and was completed in 1890. The architect is unknown. The architectural style is national romance eclecticism. The mosque has a 51-meters height minaret near the door, two halls, it is one-storied. The interior is designed in the medieval Oriental traditions. In 1930 the mosque was closed done by the authorities. In 1990-1992 it underwent reconstruction of both facades and the interior. In 1992 it was returned to the believers.

== See also ==
- Islam in Tatarstan
- Islam in Russia
- List of mosques in Russia
- List of mosques in Europe
