= Husainia Mosque, Orenburg =

Heritage site in Orenburg, Russia

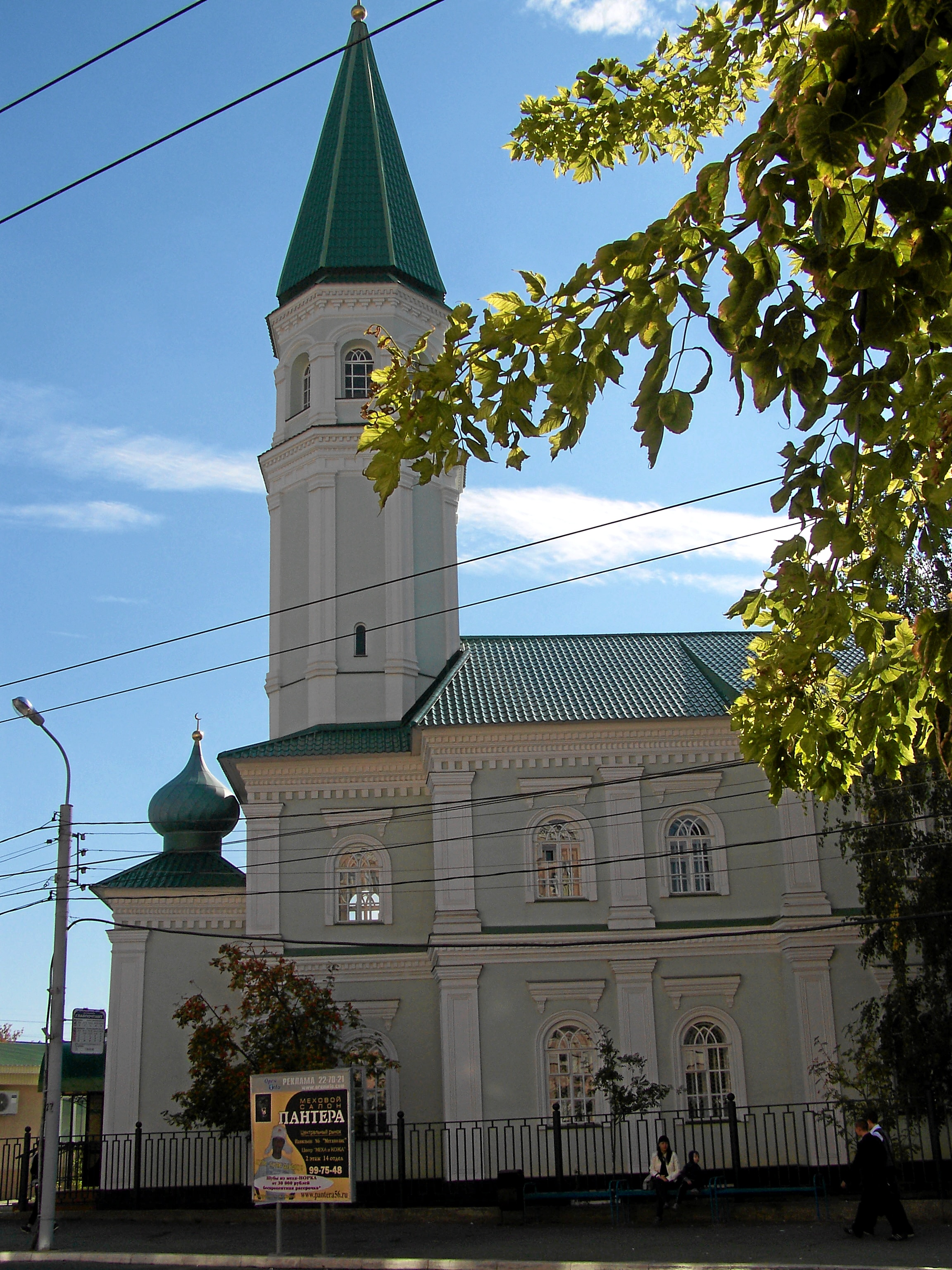

Religion
- Affiliation: Islam
- Region: Orenburg

Location
- Country: Russia
- Interactive map of Husainia Mosque, Orenburg
- Coordinates: 51.76193056°N 55.09426667°E

Husainia Mosque (Russian: Мечеть Хусаиния) is a historic mosque in Orenburg, Russia. Built in 1892 near the madrasah of the same name, it was initiated and financed by the Tatar merchant of the first guild, Akhmed-bay Khusainov. The architect was presumably D. P. Korin.

By the 19th century, Orenburg had become an important trading hub and was rapidly expanding. The idea to build a new mosque arose from the desire to create a spiritual center for the rapidly growing Muslim community.

Between 1903 and 1905, a new madrasah building was erected nearby, equipped with the latest technologies of the time.

In the autumn of 1917, the three-story building of the madrasa was transformed into the Teacher's Institute (Darulmugallim) named after A. G. Husainova, soon transformed into the Tatar Institute of Public Education, and then into the Tatar Pedagogical College. The dormitory of the technical school is located in the building of the mosque.

Since the late 1930s, the Khusainiya temple complex was transferred to the local Ministry of Internal Affairs.
