= Munira Mosque =

Mosque in Ufa, Russia

- Мөнирә мәсете
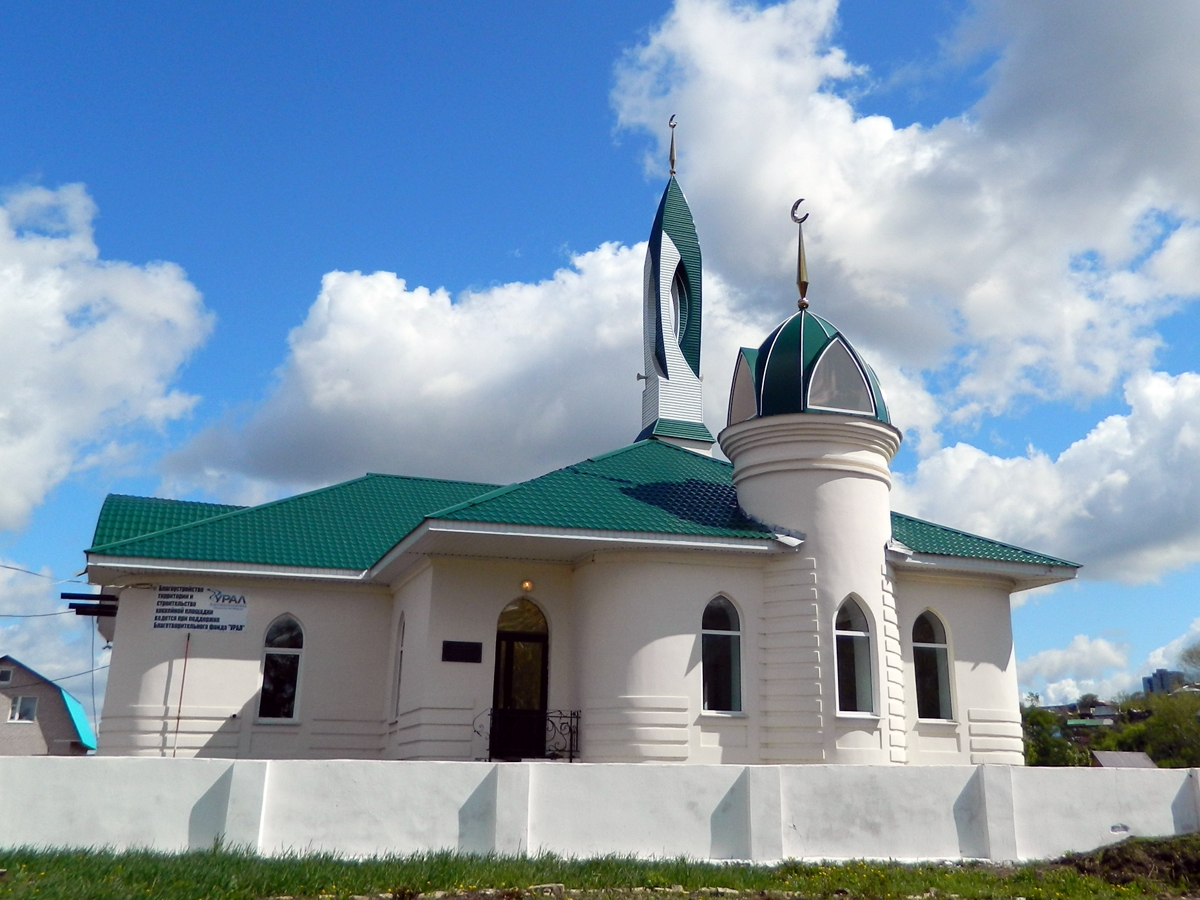

Religion
- Affiliation: Islam
- Region: Republic of Bashkortostan
- Ecclesiastical or organisational status: Mosque
- Status: active

Location
- Location: Ufa
- Country: Russia
- Interactive map of Munira Mosque
- Coordinates: 54°43′42″N 55°54′30″E

The Munira Mosque (Russian: Мечеть «Мунира»; Bashkir: «Мөнирә» мәсете) is a mosque in Ufa, in the Republic of Bashkortostan, Russia.

== History ==
The Munira Mosque was built with the personal funds of Munira Baigildina, who is the chairperson of the Muslim Ladies' Society.

A hockey rink is next to the mosque.
