= Midnight Sun Mosque =

Northernmost mosque in Western Hemisphere

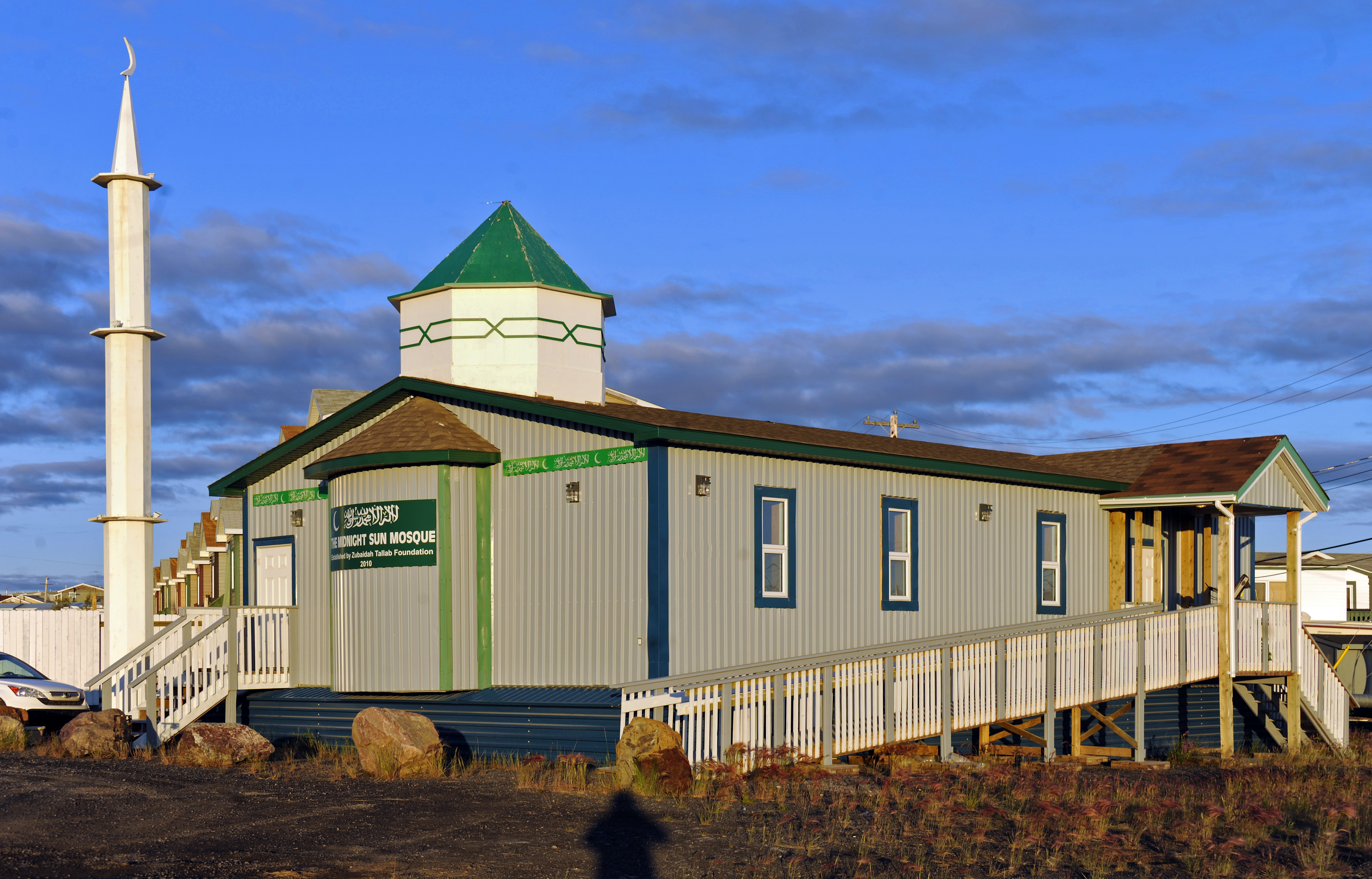
- Mosque in the midnight sun, July 2015

- Location in Northwest Territories Location in Canada

Religion
- Affiliation: Islam
- Year consecrated: 2010

Location
- Location: 29 Wolverine Road, Inuvik, Northwest Territories, Canada
- Coordinates: 68°22′06″N 133°44′15″W

Architecture
- Architects: Fathallah Farjat (dome and minaret)
- Style: Islamic original architecture
- Founder: Zubaidah Tallab Foundation
- Groundbreaking: 2010
- Completed: November 10, 2010

Specifications
- Direction of façade: NNE
- Capacity: ~100
- Minaret: 1
- Minaret height: 10 m (33 ft)

The Midnight Sun Mosque, also known as the Inuvik Mosque or Little Mosque on the Tundra, is a non-denominational Islamic house of worship located in Inuvik, Northwest Territories, Canada. The mosque was built in 2010 for the town's small Muslim community. It is the northernmost mosque in the Western Hemisphere and the only one in North America above the Arctic Circle. (Note: Elsewhere in Canada's north, mosques have subsequently been built in Iqaluit, Yellowknife and Whitehorse, all south of the Arctic Circle at 63º, 62º and 60ºN respectively. The Islamic Community Center of Anchorage Alaska, the first mosque in that U.S. state and the third northernmost in North America, is also south of the Arctic Circle at 61ºN.)

Inuvik's Muslim community outgrew its original worship centre, a truck trailer, by the late 2000s. They had bought land for a mosque, but construction costs were too great. A Winnipeg-based Islamic charity funded a prefabricated mosque that was taken by truck to Hay River, twice nearly falling into a creek. From Hay River, it was floated via barge across Great Slave Lake and down the Mackenzie River to Inuvik, where it was moved to its permanent location on the northern edge of the town.

Religious observances at the mosque, held per Sunni tradition although they are open to all Muslims, have made some adjustments to the Arctic. In some years Ramadan, with its daily fasts required during the day for a full month, falls during either midnight sun or polar night. Since it is impossible to fast between sunrise and sunset, worshippers use the corresponding times on that day in Mecca, but at their local time. During midnight sun this means that the traditional evening iftar meal is consumed while the sun is still out. Biryani served is made from reindeer meat instead of beef.

The mosque operates Inuvik's food bank, most of which is stocked with halal food donated from elsewhere in Canada. It is available to all regardless of faith, and serves hundreds of families in the area. Muslims elsewhere also contribute qurbani foods for Eid al-Adha.

== Building and location ==
The mosque is located on the south side of Wolverine Road, 200 metres (660 ft) northeast of its junctions with Navy and Adams roads, at the northern corner of the residential portion of Inuvik. Across the road, north and east, is scrubby taiga. Northwest is an area of commercial and industrial properties that continues for several kilometers along the Dempster Highway.

The building itself is a single-story modular building sided in vertical light blue-gray metallic siding with (mostly) dark blue trim and imitation foundation. It is topped by a gently pitched front-gabled roof finished with brown shingles.

The north (front, facing toward Mecca over the North Pole (Note: The compass direction is given as -22°N, or 338°, to account for the declination offset created by the north magnetic pole at this latitude. By true north it is 6°N.)) facade is topped by a short two-stage white octagonal tower, with a looping pattern. Atop it is a green octagonal cone topped with a crescent moon finial.

A wooden wheelchair ramp runs along the west side to a rear entrance. The mosque's casement windows have dark blue surrounds. The second and third are more widely spaced. Light fixtures similar to those on the front are mounted north of the first window and between the second and third. The east profile is identical to the west one, without the wheelchair ramp.

To the northeast of the front entrance stands a three-stage 10-metre (33 ft) white minaret. It is in the Ottoman style, narrow and octagonal. When dark, it can be illuminated by lights at the top of the first and second stages.

The mosque has a total interior floor space of 144.4 m^{2} (1,554 ft^{2}), comprising a prayer hall, library, kitchen, and children's playroom. The main prayer hall has dedicated prayer spaces for men and women and is lined with ornate red carpet.

== History ==
=== Muslims in Inuvik ===
Muslims have been in the Inuvik area at least since Peter Baker, a Lebanese-Canadian trapper who started an Edmonton-based trading company, provided supplies to oil prospectors working out of the Mackenzie River delta region, where Inuvik was established as an administrative centre in the early 1960s. He was later elected to represent the Mackenzie North riding in the Northwest Territories Legislative Assembly in 1964, making him the first known Muslim elected to office in Canada. In 2011 it was reported that one Muslim resident, an Albanian, had been living in Inuvik since the early 1970s.

Muslims began coming to Inuvik in greater numbers starting in the mid-1970s, as the Arctic oil exploration boom created new job opportunities. The boom ended with the collapse of oil prices in 1986. By the 2000s, there were a hundred Muslims in Inuvik, mostly Sunni from Egypt, Lebanon and the Sudan, including all the town's taxi drivers, and many architects, engineers and businessmen. (Note: According to Immigration, Refugees and Citizenship Canada, immigrants, more than half of whom have come to Inuvik for economic reasons, make up 7 percent of the town's population. The greatest portion come from Asia, the Philippines in particular.) Many were men whose families remained in southern Canada, supported by the relatively high incomes from jobs in the Arctic. Some of the congregants' wives had joined them in Inuvik, but many had to leave their children in southern Canada to be educated in their faith.

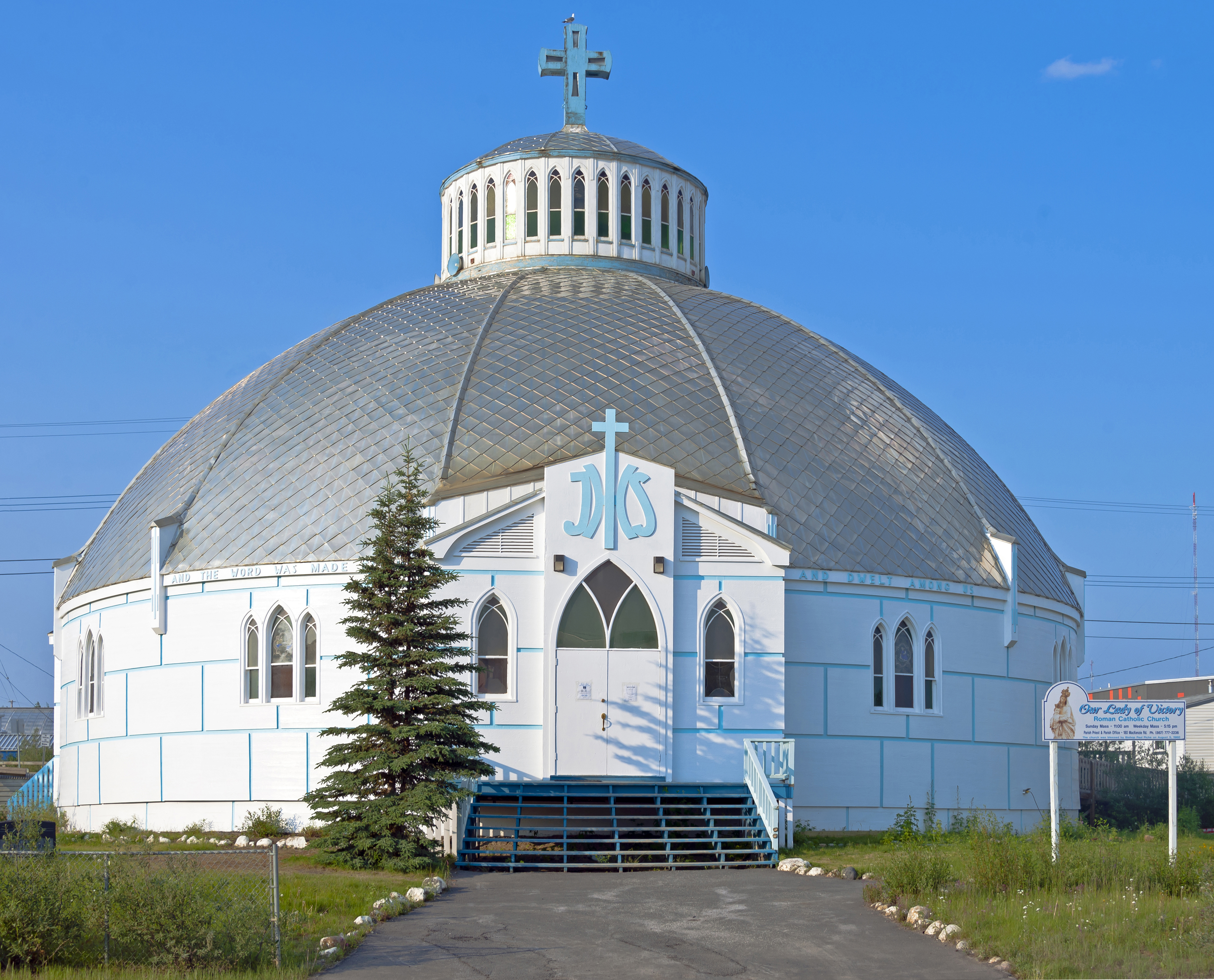
Our Lady of Victory Church, used by early Inuvik Muslim communities for prayer

The men prayed at Our Lady of Victory Church, the igloo-shaped Roman Catholic church in downtown Inuvik. Beginning in 2000, the local Muslim community was served by a converted 2.7-by-4.3-metre (9 by 14 ft) truck trailer with space for 20 attendees; Eid al-Fitr celebrations were held at the town's curling lounge or its arena. A painted crescent moon over the entrance was the only outward sign it was a mosque Inside, prayer rows were marked on the carpet with tape. On Fridays men took turns leading the services and giving the jumah sermon to a packed house.

=== Transport and construction of mosque ===
An Egyptian imam was impressed with the community centre on a 2008 visit. He advised members to incorporate a non-profit society as a step toward building a formal mosque; they soon founded the Muslim Association of Inuvik. A Sudanese taxi driver who had been one of the earliest Muslims in town bought two lots at $90,000 in support of the construction effort.

Building the mosque was a challenge. While Inuvik's remote location had made the land affordable, it also greatly inflated construction costs. The modest structure they had in mind would cost half a million Canadian dollars. A member reached out to Saudi-born businessman Hussain Guisti, who had built a mosque for the small Muslim community in the similarly remote northern city of Thompson, Manitoba, while his wife was doing her medical residency there. He had overcome high construction costs by having the mosque prefabricated in Winnipeg and trucked over 750 kilometres (470 mi) to Thompson.

Guisti had never heard of Inuvik before he got the call, but when he looked for the town's location on a map, he decided he had to make the mosque possible, believing (erroneously) that it would make history as the northernmost mosque yet built. Before agreeing to fund the construction, Guisti imposed three conditions. First, while the mosque would be open to all Muslims, worship would follow the Sunni traditions he had been raised in. Second, the mosque would have to be financially self-sustaining once it was open. Last, he wanted to call the first prayer.

In early 2010, Guisti's Zubaidah Tallab Foundation (ZTF) funded the construction of the mosque. Instead of building it on site in Inuvik, the ZTF realized it would be cheaper to have the mosque prefabricated in a Winnipeg warehouse. That September, the completed mosque was shipped over 4,000 km (2,500 mi) in two sections on trucks and river barge to its current location.

The mosque's journey was heavily covered by the media, which termed it "Little Mosque on the Tundra" after the CBC series Little Mosque on the Prairie, and beset with difficulties. On the road leg, a truck took it first to Edmonton, where it would take a route north to Hay River in the Northwest Territories (NWT) for the beginning of the barge trip. The water route was necessary because several bridges on the upper reaches of the Dempster Highway, the only road to Inuvik, were too narrow for the trucks carrying the mosque.

In Edmonton, it was held up for a day due to construction and heavy traffic, and authorities there made the trucks wait two more days for Labour Day weekend to pass. After crossing the 60th parallel into the NWT, the truck had to cross the very narrow Reindeer Bridge, which was not wide enough for the trucks. After the driver took the tires off and used another truck to balance the building, they attempted the crossing, only for that section of the mosque to become unbalanced and threaten to fall off the trailer into the creek. The crew attempted to compensate by moving all the construction supplies for the interior, such as carpeting, furniture and plumbing, to the opposite side of the structure, but that only made it lean the other direction as they attempted the crossing a second time. A construction crew in the area used their backhoes and lent chains to secure it to the truck bed, and it was able to cross successfully. "We almost had an underwater mosque, a house of worship for toads and fish," Guisti said later.

This caused delays getting to Hay River, where the mosque was scheduled for the last barge of the season—any later and the water levels along the Mackenzie might not be high enough to guarantee passage all the way to Inuvik. Only a late phone call to the barge operator persuaded it to wait. Once the mosque reached the barge, it was transferred to it but rough weather on Great Slave Lake kept the vessel in port for another two days. The trip across the lake and down the Mackenzie to Inuvik took ten days, and the mosque reached its destination in late September, greeted by 40 local Muslims, as snow fell for the first time that autumn. At the time of its arrival the congregation had not chosen a name for the mosque. One member jokingly suggested calling it the "Graceful Mosque" because it had reached Inuvik intact.

Assembling the interior furnishings and dome was the next challenge. Some of the congregants volunteered to do so, but they did not know how. Fathallah Farjat, a Palestinian-born carpenter then working in Hamilton, Ontario, heard about the problem and called Guisti, who paid for his flight to Inuvik. Farjat worked for six weeks without pay on the mosque's interior, doing framing, hanging drywall, laying carpet, finding space for a kitchen, and designing, then building, the dome and pulpit. A minaret, not part of the original design, was suggested; Farjat then designed and built one despite never having done so before.

On the suggestion of an engineer in the congregation, the mosque is oriented on a very north-northeast qibla, its front facing Mecca over the North Pole. This is distinct from most other mosques in North America, which face more to the east, via the direct or great circle routes. Omar Mouallem considers this an example of ijtihad, since it was not derived from any religious authority. Services are held in both Arabic and English.

The mosque officially opened two months later on November 10, with Guisti calling the first prayer. After a day-long open house at the mosque, the community hosted a dinner at the local arena open to all Inuvik residents. Lebanese and Palestinian relatives of one local restaurateur arranged for enough supplies to be flown in from Edmonton for a Middle Eastern dinner attended by 500–600. A man came from Dubai to personally donate the carpeting. "The day was filled with a lot of emotion", recalled Nilufer Rahman, a Winnipeg documentarian Guisti hired to make a film about the mosque. "It was refreshing to see so many grown men cry."

=== Food bank ===
Following the mosque's completion, the Muslim Welfare Centre (MWC) in Toronto provided the funds to purchase an adjacent property to set up the "Arctic Food Bank". It distributes groceries to the town's population, and is now Inuvik's largest charity.

The food bank was the first full-service one to be established in Inuvik, according to the mosque leadership. It fills a need since the town's remoteness and dependence on the mostly unpaved 715-kilometre (444 mi) Dempster Highway as its main conduit for goods results in higher prices at local markets, which can rise still further as fuel prices do. Since locals are thus often reluctant to donate in quantity, the MWC ships at least $35,000 worth of donated halal food to Inuvik annually, available to all residents for free once every two weeks if they have registered. As of 2019 that included 700 families living within two hours' drive of Inuvik; the mosque estimated that at any given time one-quarter to one-third of the immediate residents have used the food bank.

== Ramadan ==
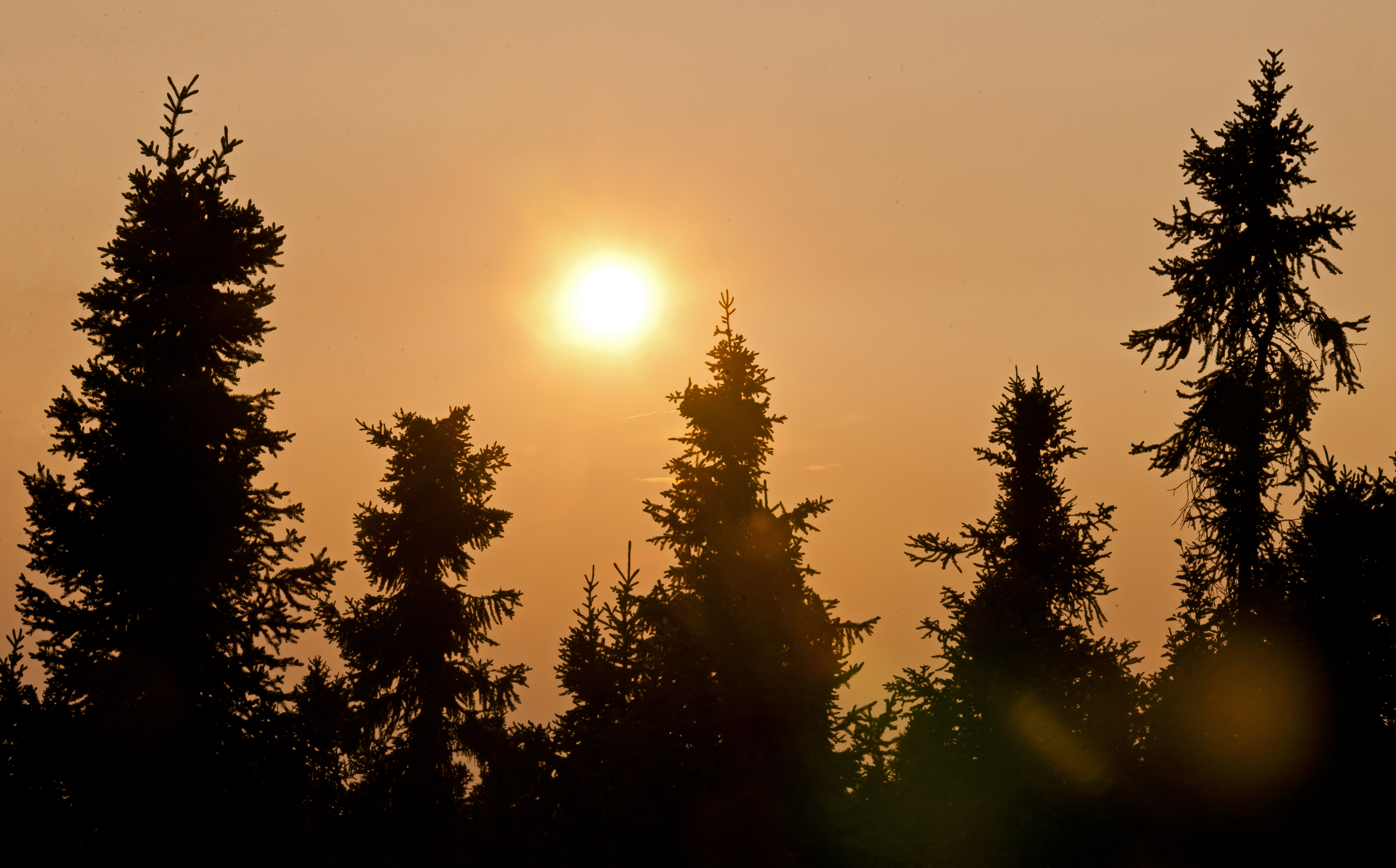
The midnight sun near Inuvik

As with other mosques in the Arctic and subarctic, great variations in the length of the day over the course of the year affect how the community observes Ramadan, when Muslims fast during the day for a month and only eat at night, as determined by the rising and setting of the sun. In some years in Inuvik since the mosque opened, Ramadan has occurred during the midnight sun period between May and July that gives the mosque its name; and in the years around 2030 it will occur during the month-long polar night in December and January, when the sun never rises.

During both those periods of the year it would be impractical and unhealthy to fast based on the movements of the sun, so many Muslim congregations above the Arctic Circle fast based on the time of day at Mecca, or some city to the south with a more regular diurnal cycle. The Midnight Sun Mosque's worshippers decided to use the times of sunrise and sunset at Mecca, but in Inuvik's North American Mountain Time Zone, since Mecca is nine hours ahead of local time. This results in a fast that usually lasts 13 hours out of 24, beginning around 5 a.m. and ending around 6:30 p.m.

After a debate early in the mosque's history, the congregation settled on this timetable so that all would eat and pray at the same time. "The purpose is to worship, not to be tortured," said one member. "If you are doing something beyond your capability as a human, that is not Islam."

The resulting schedule has taken some getting used to. Under the midnight sun, it is still broad daylight when the iftar meal that ends the daily fast is prepared and served. "You're supposed to break your fast when it's dusk, and we eat when the sun is out. It's not usual to have iftar when the sun is up", one member told The Guardian.

Timing is not the only concession the feast makes to its location. Inuvialuit food has also influenced the menu. Dates and curries, common elements at iftar meals around the world, are served. But biryani served at the Midnight Sun Mosque is made with reindeer meat, not the traditional beef.

During Ramadan, the food bank is supplied with qurbani, the lamb, goat and beef meats that prosperous Muslims are required to donate to the needy for Eid al-Adha. Local hunters have offered surplus food, but most local game meat is not halal. The mosque accepts reindeer or moose, but only if the animal has been killed according to dhabihah requirements: by facing it toward Mecca, cutting its jugular vein and saying "In the name of Allah". Inuvialuit hunters prefer to follow their own sacrificial traditions, so the mosque receives little of this meat. Fishermen, in contrast, offer large quantities of surplus trout and pike in summer.

== Legacy ==
Amier Suliman, one of the congregants, remarked to an Egyptian news outlet that "this [the mosque] is the first minaret to be erected in the Arctic ... some will say it's a new frontier for Islam." The construction and transport of the mosque inspired children's author Shazia Afzal and illustrator Aliya Ghare to co-create the book Journey of the Midnight Sun. The book was published by Orca Book Publishers and released on March 15, 2022.

Denny Rodgers, then mayor of Inuvik, said in 2011 that the mosque was "a nice addition to the community". The former trailer was an undistinguished building, "but now the minaret tower is lit up all the time. At night it's quite spectacular. We're already known for the Igloo [Roman Catholic] Church, but now the mosque provides another feature to help us attract quality professionals to move here, bring their families, and become part of the community."

== See also ==
- Islam in Canada
- List of mosques in Canada
- Nord Kamal Mosque, northernmost purpose-built mosque in the world, in Norilsk, Russia
