= Our Lady of Victory Church (Inuvik) =

Catholic "Igloo Church" in Canadian Arctic

Our Lady Of Victory Church
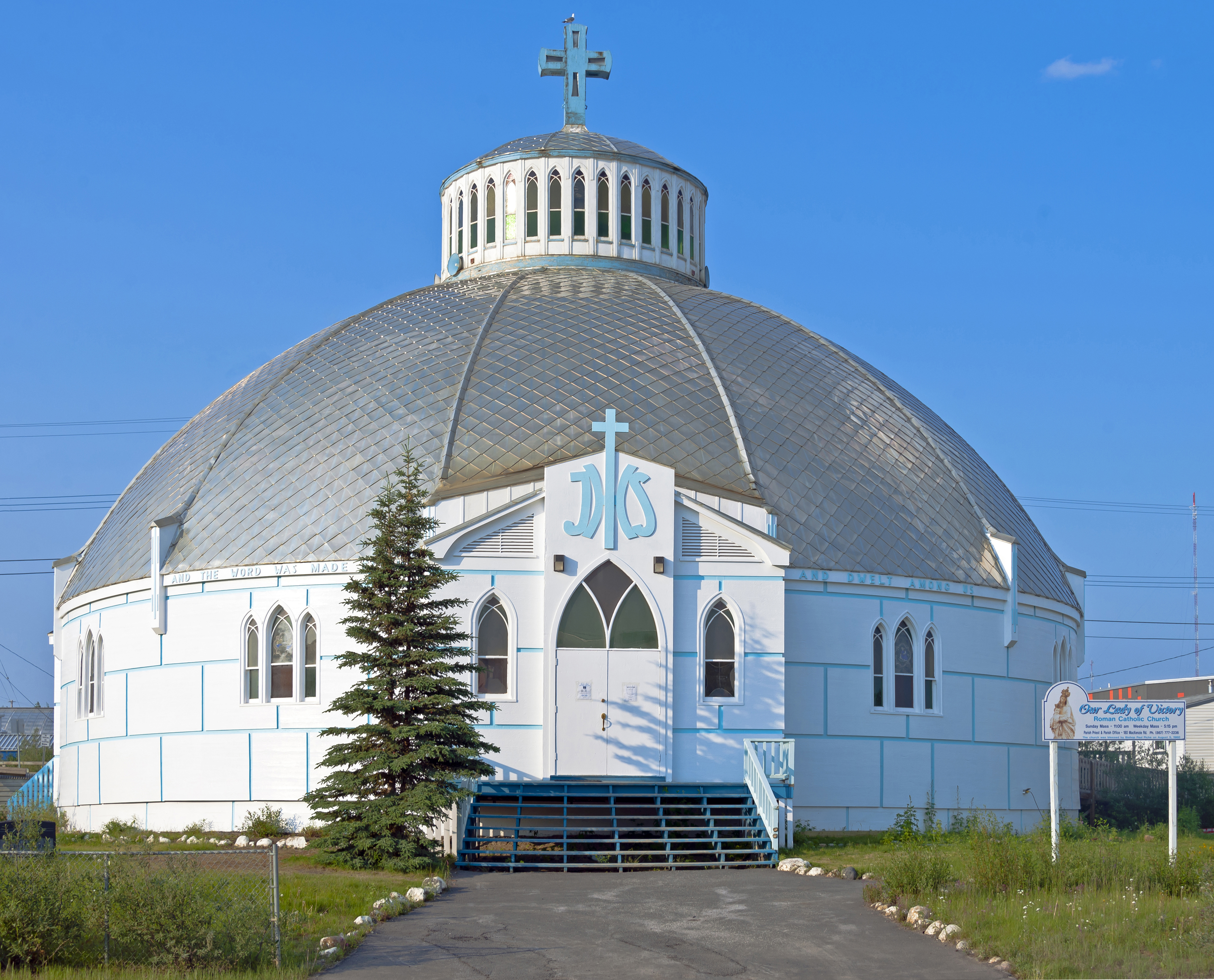
- West (front) view, 2015

- Location of Inuvik within Canada

Religion
- Affiliation: Roman Catholic
- Leadership: The Rev. Jon Hansen, C.Ss.R, pastor
- Year consecrated: 1960

Location
- Location: Inuvik, NT, Canada
- Coordinates: 68.35799°N 133.72220°W

Architecture
- Architect: Maurice Larocque
- Groundbreaking: 1958
- Completed: 1960

Specifications
- Direction of façade: south
- Capacity: 350
- Width: 23 metres (75 ft)
- Height (max): 19 metres (62 ft)
- Dome: 1
- Dome height (outer): 16 metres (52 ft)
- Materials: Reinforced concrete, wood, aluminum
- Elevation: 20 m (66 ft)

Website
- olvinuvik.com

Our Lady of Victory Church, often called the Igloo Church, is located on Mackenzie Road in downtown Inuvik, Northwest Territories, Canada. It serves a Catholic parish of the Diocese of Mackenzie-Fort Smith. It was established in the mid-1950s, around the time Inuvik was being built; the church was opened and consecrated in 1960 after two years of construction.

Brother Maurice Larocque, a Catholic missionary to the Arctic who had previously been a carpenter, designed the church despite a lack of any formal architectural training, sketching it on two sheets of plywood that are prominently displayed in the building's upper storeys. The round shape, which is painted to mimic an igloo, was chosen to mitigate possible structural damage that might be caused by frost heave. Its unique structural system, "a dome within a dome", further protects the church with a foundation consisting of a bowl-shaped concrete slab on a gravel bed atop the permafrost and, in the building itself, an intricate system of wooden arches to support the load.

It is the only major building in Inuvik that does not rest on pilings. Wood for the church was floated down the Mackenzie River from Fort Smith, nearly 2,000 kilometres (1,200 mi) away. Construction was completed without a building permit as the federal government officials in Ottawa who would have issued one could not understand Larocque's blueprints and sent them back to Inuvik.

Today the church is the town's best-known landmark and its most-photographed building. Travel writer Robin Esrock describes it as "a church that doesn't look like any other church on Earth." The interior is decorated with paintings by Inuk artist Mona Thrasher. In the summer months the parish gives tours.

== Building and grounds ==
Our Lady of Victory is located on a lot at the eastern corner of the intersection of Mackenzie and Kingmingya roads in the centre of Inuvik. The surrounding neighbourhood is dominated by residential and commercial developments on similarly large lots, most no taller than two storeys and flat-roofed with thick walls and aluminum siding. Two blocks to the southeast is MacKenzie Square, Inuvik's main park.

The terrain rises gently towards the hills northeast of Inuvik from the east channel of the Mackenzie River delta 400 metres (1,300 ft) to the southeast; the church is located at roughly 20 metres (66 ft) above sea level. The church is set amid a lawn; a chainlink fence runs along the sidewalks at the southern and western sides of the lot; the latter has some evergreens and shrubs native to the area planted along the inside. On the northern side a utilidor, a narrow above-ground tunnel carrying gas and water lines, marks the rear line of the property.

A short asphalt walkway, lined with white stones, leads from Mackenzie to the church's main entrance pavilion. It is joined by a narrower one, similarly treated, that comes in from the east, connecting to the unpaved parking lot the church shares with the commercial building next door. Surrounding the church is a planting bed, also lined with white stone. The church's sign stands in its lawn to the south; a stone marker protesting legalized abortion is in the western quadrant. Two mature black spruce grow to the height of the pavilion roof on its north side; another one grows at the end of the row of shrubs along the utilidor at the east corner of the lot.

=== Exterior ===
The church building itself is a circular timber frame structure 23 metres (75 ft) in diameter on a foundation of a reinforced concrete basement on a bowl-shaped concrete slab that itself sits on a metre-thick (3 ft) gravel bed atop the permafrost that is generally found at 2 metres (6 ft) underground at Inuvik's latitude. Its walls are faced in wood siding with large painted rectangular grooves creating an ashlar pattern. Secondary entrances project from the north and west sides of the building. Fenestration otherwise consists of small lancet windows flanked by narrower ones, set with stained glass; there are three bays of these between the rear and front entrances and two between the rear entrances.

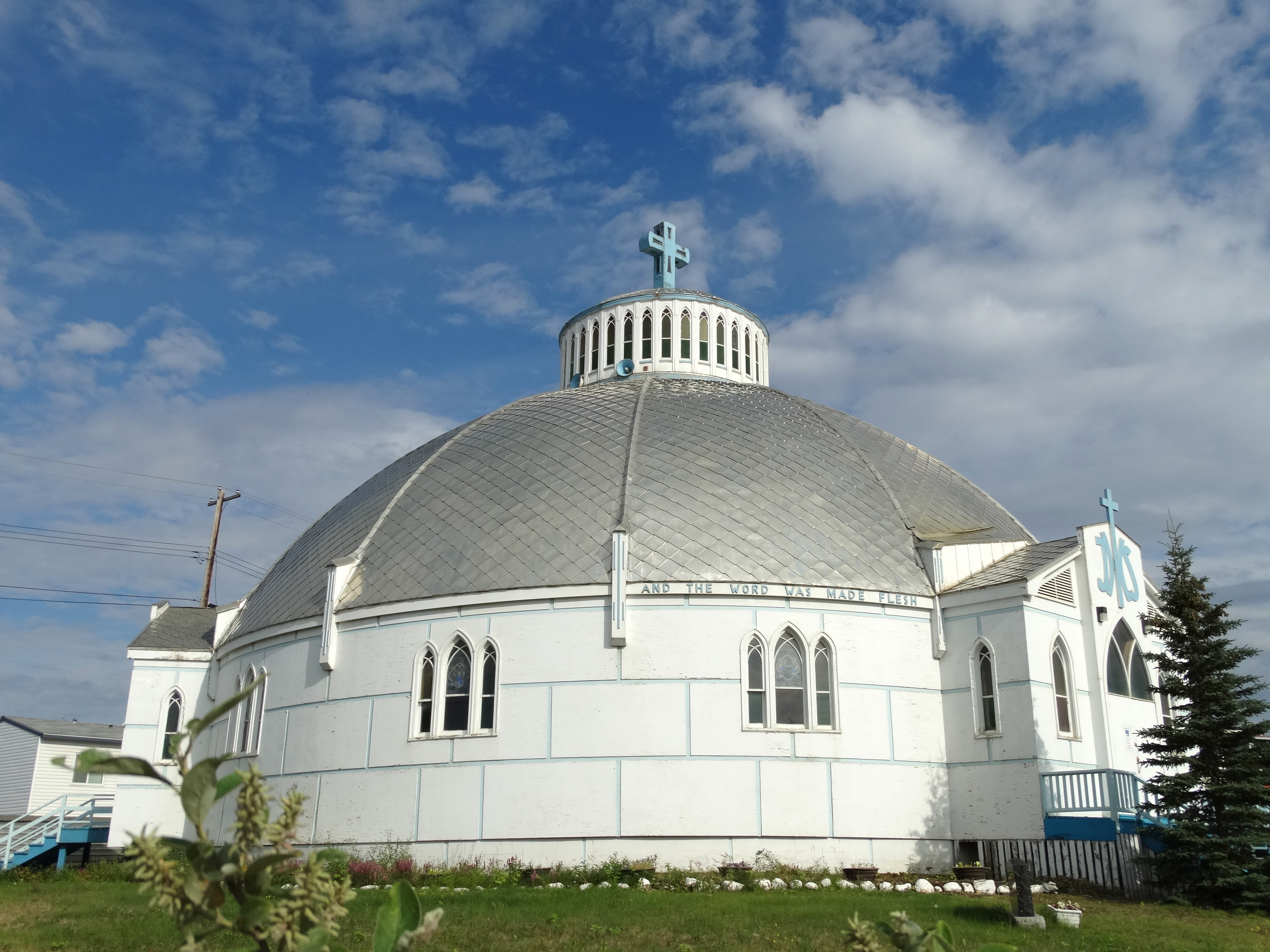
Church from northwest

At the roofline is a cornice of laminated 5.1-by-25.4-centimetre (2 by 10 in) lumber. Affixed to it on the bays flanking the front entrance are wooden capital letters spelling out John 1:14: "And the Word was made flesh, and dwelt among us." Between the front and back two wooden corbels straddle the roofline, with a single one between the rear entrances.

The domed roof is sheathed in diamond-shaped aluminum scales. Ribs delineate each of the building's bays. At the centre of the dome is a round 6.1-metre-wide (20 ft) cupola, set with very narrow stained glass windows divided by projecting wooden strips. Two loudspeaker megaphones project from its east and west sides. Atop its similarly treated domed aluminum roof is a 2.7-metre-high (9 ft) wooden blue cross. It has light bulbs and is illuminated, along with the cupola interior, during the winter months. (Note: By early November, Inuvik gets less than five hours of sun a day. Polar night, when the sun never rises, starts December 6 and lasts until January 10. The days begin to get longer than five hours again in February.)

Open wooden steps lead up from the front walkway to the front-gabled entrance pavilion. The main entrance, on a slightly projecting middle section with a gabled top that rises slightly higher, is topped by a Gothic arched transom set with tinted glass divided by two mullions curving outwards. It is flanked near its point by two modern light fixtures. In the entablature above it is a wooden "IHS" Christogram from the middle of which rises the vertical line of a wooden cross at the gable apex.

On either side of the entrance section are recessed narrow Gothic arched windows in molded surrounds set with tinted glass, one horizontal mullion at centre and two curved ones curving inward from the edges, in contrast to those on the entrance transom. On each side of the pavilion is a similarly treated, narrower window. At the roofline of the entrance pavilion is a plain frieze; above it on either side of the entrance projection are louvered vents. At the eaves of the roof a flap of wood hangs down, broad near the bottom and narrow at the top, following the surround of the vents beneath. Behind the pavilion is a more gently pitched engaged gabled face with vertica battens. The northern entrance has a similar pavilion with an intertwined, stylized "AM" in the place of the Christogram, and no cross. At the northeast a smaller wooden-sided utilidor connects to the municipal one behind it. The northeast entrance pavilion has a different wooden decoration on its entablature.

=== Interior ===
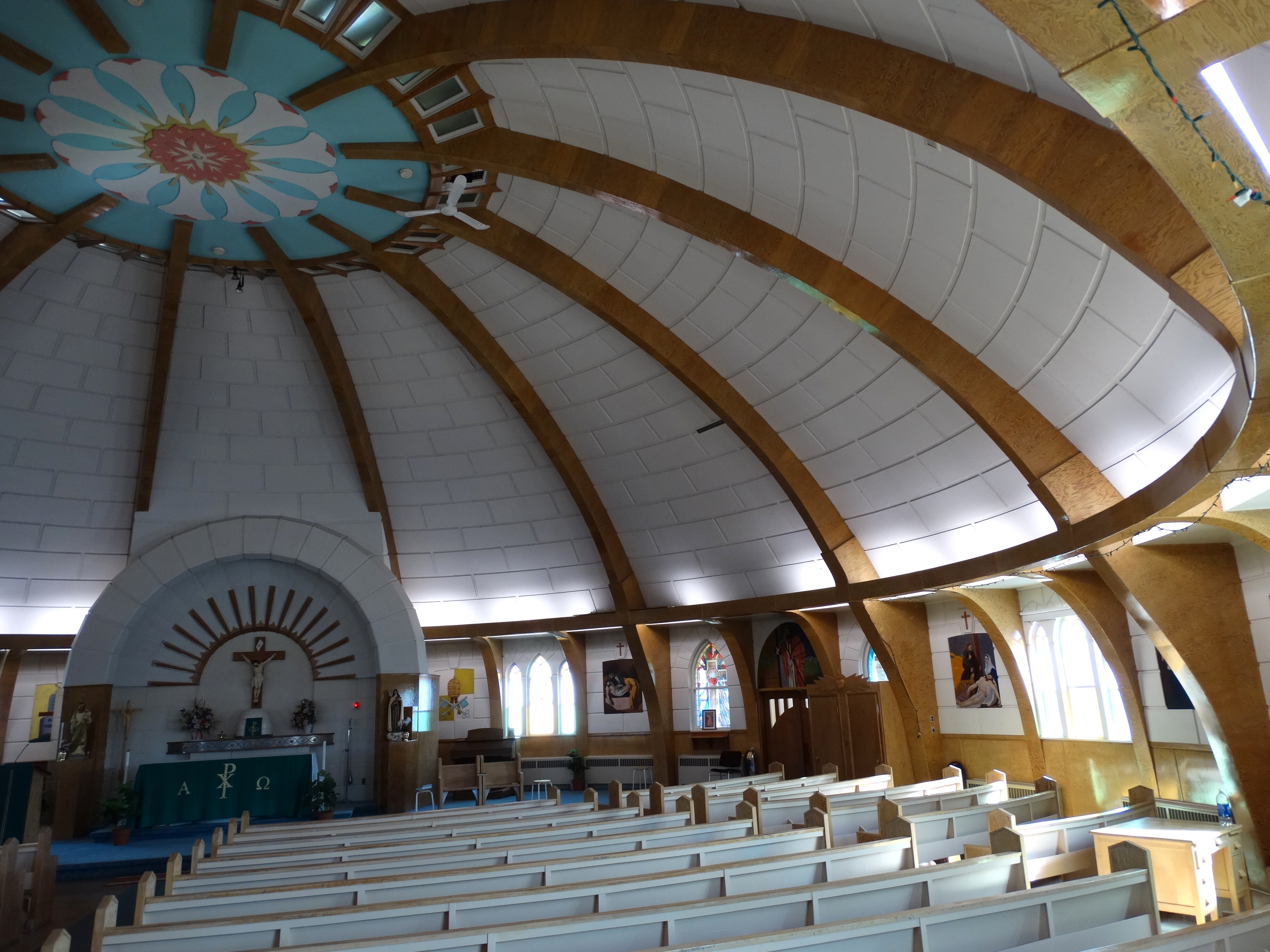
Interior, showing ceiling, 2013

All three entrances use heavy, opaque, modern metal doors. On the inside, the sanctuary has curved rows of wooden pews on a hardwood floor divided by a central aisle that offers seating for 350. Laminated wooden buttresses flank all the windows; in between them are the painted Stations of the Cross. Every third buttress is heavier and thicker. The walls are finished in shiplap below the windowsill level; above that a chair rail sets off a finish of grooved rectangles similar to those on the exterior.

At the northeast end the altar and baptismal font sit on a dais. Behind the altar is a round-arched alcove faced in shiplap below the springline; above it are the same block motif as the interior and exterior walls. Two small statues of Christ sit on pedestals fronting either side. On the back of the alcove is a crucifix with a sunburst pattern above.

The larger buttresses support the 12 main laminated wooden ceiling vaults, which widen to 3.0 metres (10 ft) at their uppermost. Between them is the same block pattern. They meet at a central rosette below the cupola, bordered by small windows that let natural light in. A ceiling fan hangs nearby. Wooden stairs from behind the altar lead up to the cupola from the sanctuary, which has an aluminum ceiling.

== History ==
Planning for the church began as the Canadian government was building Inuvik itself in the late 1950s, as an administrative centre for the Mackenzie Delta region to replace Aklavik, located more centrally in the delta, which was becoming more and more vulnerable to flooding as it grew. In 1955 The Rev. Joseph Adam, Roman Catholic pastor to the townsite under construction, began looking for an architect to design a church for the local congregation. Brother Maurice Larocque, a Quebec-born missionary with the Church's Oblate Order, took the commission.

Larocque had worked in the Canadian North since 1930. Before becoming a missionary, he had worked as a carpenter, an experience that had led to him designing various buildings for the distant communities he worked in despite his lack of formal architectural training. For the new townsite on the delta, he sought to design a church which would reflect the local culture.

The environment put some constraints on a potential design. Inuvik is 200 kilometres (120 mi) north of the Arctic Circle; at that latitude in North America, permafrost is only 2 metres (6 ft) below ground. Thus, most buildings in the area then and now are built on pilings anchored in the permafrost, elevating them slightly above ground. But that solution would not work for a conventional church due to the possibility of frost heave should the underlying permafrost melt partially. "If we build a church with a steeple and the pilings start to heave, it's going to fall down," Adam told a newspaper later.

To deal with that problem, Adam and Larocque decided on a circular building. "If it settles six inches on one side," he told the paper, "it won't show—and we can always jack it up to make it level again." To fulfill Larocque's intent to design a church that reflected the local culture, it would be designed and decorated to emulate an igloo.

The circular shape would not by itself mitigate the possible effects of frost heave. To further secure the building, Larocque devised a unique structural system: The church would have a reinforced concrete basement, built on a gently bowl-shaped concrete slab which itself would have a gravel bed between it and the permafrost as insulation, to prevent heat from the building from melting the permafrost. Despite Larocque's lack of training, "he knows more about architecture than many architects," Adam said.

Larocque had sketched out his plans on two pieces of plywood, which are part of the church's structure today, visible on the stairs to the cupola. To clear the building for construction and get a building permit, formal blueprints had to be sent to officials with the federal government in Ottawa. Larocque drew some up and sent them, only to have the officials send them back when they were unable to comprehend them.

Work finally began during summer 1958. Gravel for the foundation was quarried at Point Separation, the head of the Mackenzie delta, 130 kilometres (80 mi) south of the growing townsite still known only as East 3, and shipped downriver by barge to the construction site. After it was laid into the freshly excavated pit, concrete was poured over it and shaped into the bowl. Once this had set, lumber that had been similarly floated 1,900 kilometres (1,200 mi) down the Mackenzie from Fort Smith near the territorial border with Alberta, the exterior walls were built on it and by the end of the area's short summer they and the first floor had been completed.

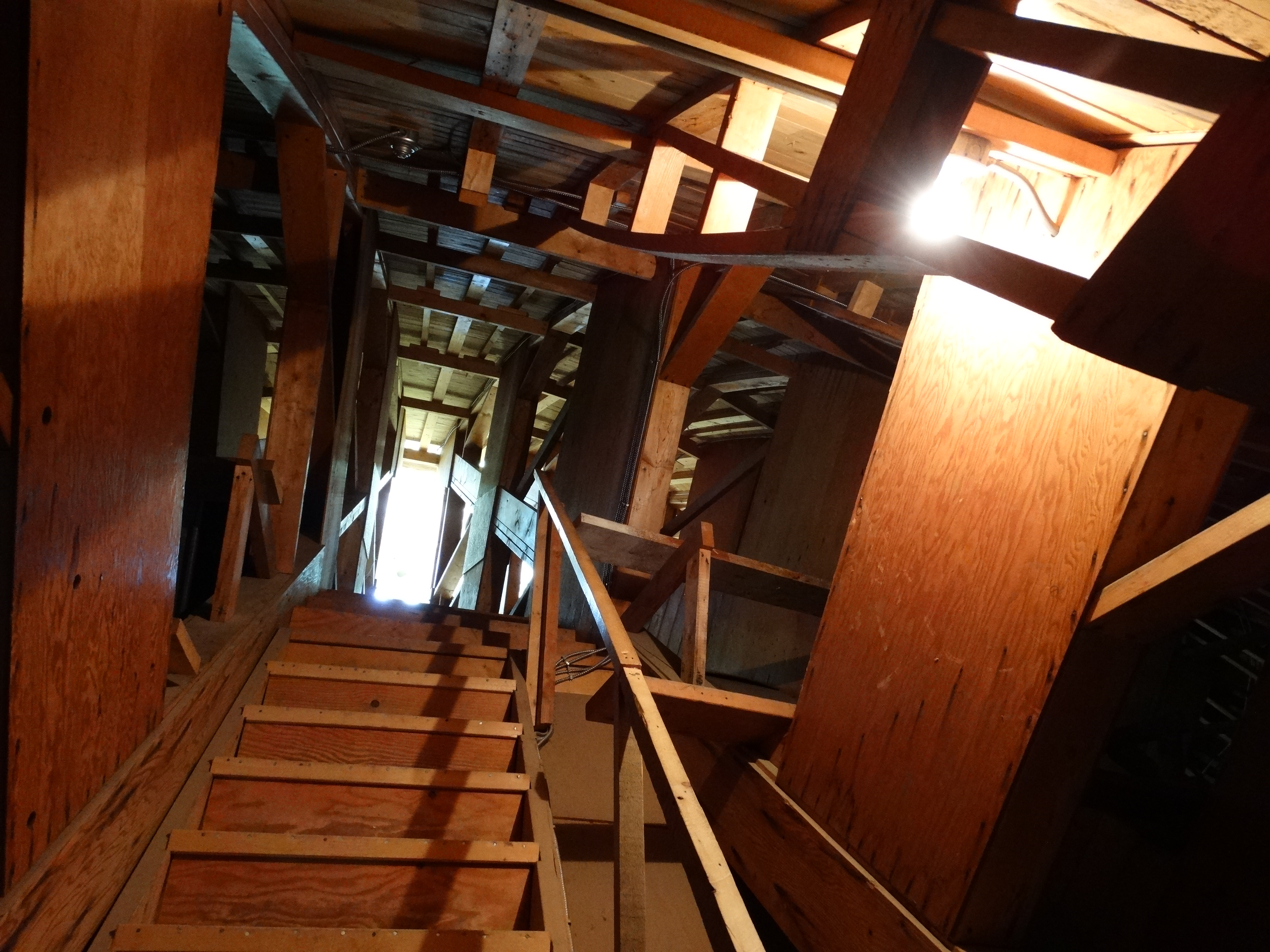
Structural timber inside the ceiling

Larocque spent the long winter in a nearby workshop, carefully supervising the assembly of the arches that were to form the domed roof. The 12 main arches were supplemented by 24 secondary ones and 72 smaller arches. (Note: According to a video on the church's website, a structural engineer who toured the church in the late 2000s speculated that there was about 50% more lumber than necessary.) His work also aroused some interest from Ottawa since the blueprints had failed to earn a permit, and more generally because he was not a registered architect. When they heard construction had begun nonetheless, they tried to have the work stopped. Bishop Paul Piché hired an engineering consultant to visit the building, who told him it was sturdy enough to last another 200 years.

In spring 1959 work on the structure continued, with many of the new town's residents volunteering their labour. The arches built over the winter were lifted into place and the exterior completed. On the inside, following the Oblate Order's reputation for making use of scrap material to minimize costs on construction projects, the shafts of used hockey sticks were used to floor a walkway in the cupola.

By winter the roof was in place, clad in reflective aluminum to make it look more like ice blocks. Larocque set himself to the church's decorative touches. To create the appearance of stained glass in the windows, an old French technique was used. The pattern was drawn and painted on translucent paper, then sandwiched between glass. Larocque created the alcove behind the altar and its crucifix himself. Adam commissioned Mona Sharer, a 17-year-old deaf-mute Inuk woman who had shown talent as an artist at a Catholic school in Aklavik, to paint the Stations of the Cross on the inside walls. She started in January 1960 and completed the work in two months, along with some other paintings of scenes from the life of Christ. Later that year the church was formally consecrated and dedicated to the Virgin Mary by Paul Piché, bishop of the Apostolic Vicariate of Mackenzie (later elevated to the Diocese of Mackenzie-Fort Smith).

Eventually, East 3 was named Inuvik and became the administrative centre the government wanted, as well as a hub for oil and gas exploration in the Canadian Arctic. In the late 1970s the Dempster Highway was completed, linking Inuvik to the rest of the North American road network, and that brought summertime tourists to Inuvik. Many took photos of the church as mementoes of their visit, and it soon became the most photographed building in town. "A trip north of the Arctic Circle is not complete without a photo in front of the Igloo Church," says the town's website. "[It is] Inuvik's pride and joy." The church began offering tours in the summer months.

The building encountered no major issues until 2013. In May, it was reported that its heating costs had doubled from the previous winter, to $3,400, after it changed its fuel to synthetic natural gas from the traditional kind. The parish council considered several options.

Chairman Doug Robertson told Northern News Services that the church was looking at applying for grants for green retrofitting. It was considering also replacing the boiler, since it could not change the heating system overall. When built, the church had used a radiant heating system. It was cheaper than the modern forced-air heating, but unlike that could not be switched off when the church was not in use as it would take too long to warm the building up. It was also necessary to keep the building warm during the bitterly cold Arctic winters to prevent structural issues from developing, and to protect the interior artwork.

That summer volunteers helped reinsulate the church's wall. During winter 2013–14 the church also worked to reduce its fuel consumption from 135 gigajoules (38,000 kWh) to 80 (22,000 kWh). That led to some cost reductions, but the church was still looking for additional funding, hopefully through selling advertising to local businesses in community calendars.

== Services ==
The church holds Mass on Sunday mornings and weekday afternoons Tuesdays through Fridays. Those services may, however, be canceled if the priest is traveling to minister to other Catholics in the delta region. Catholics seeking absolution can do so a half hour before Mass, by appointment, or even if the priest is available at the rectory. At Christmas the church holds a concert where carols are sung in the local First Nations language of Gwich'in and the Inuvialuktun dialect of Inuktitut, the Inuit language, as well as English. In recent years a choir made up of Filipino immigrants to the area has joined in, singing in Tagalog.

== See also ==
- List of Catholic churches in Canada
- List of round churches
- Midnight Sun Mosque
