= Islam in the Arctic =

Islam religion in the Arctic Circle

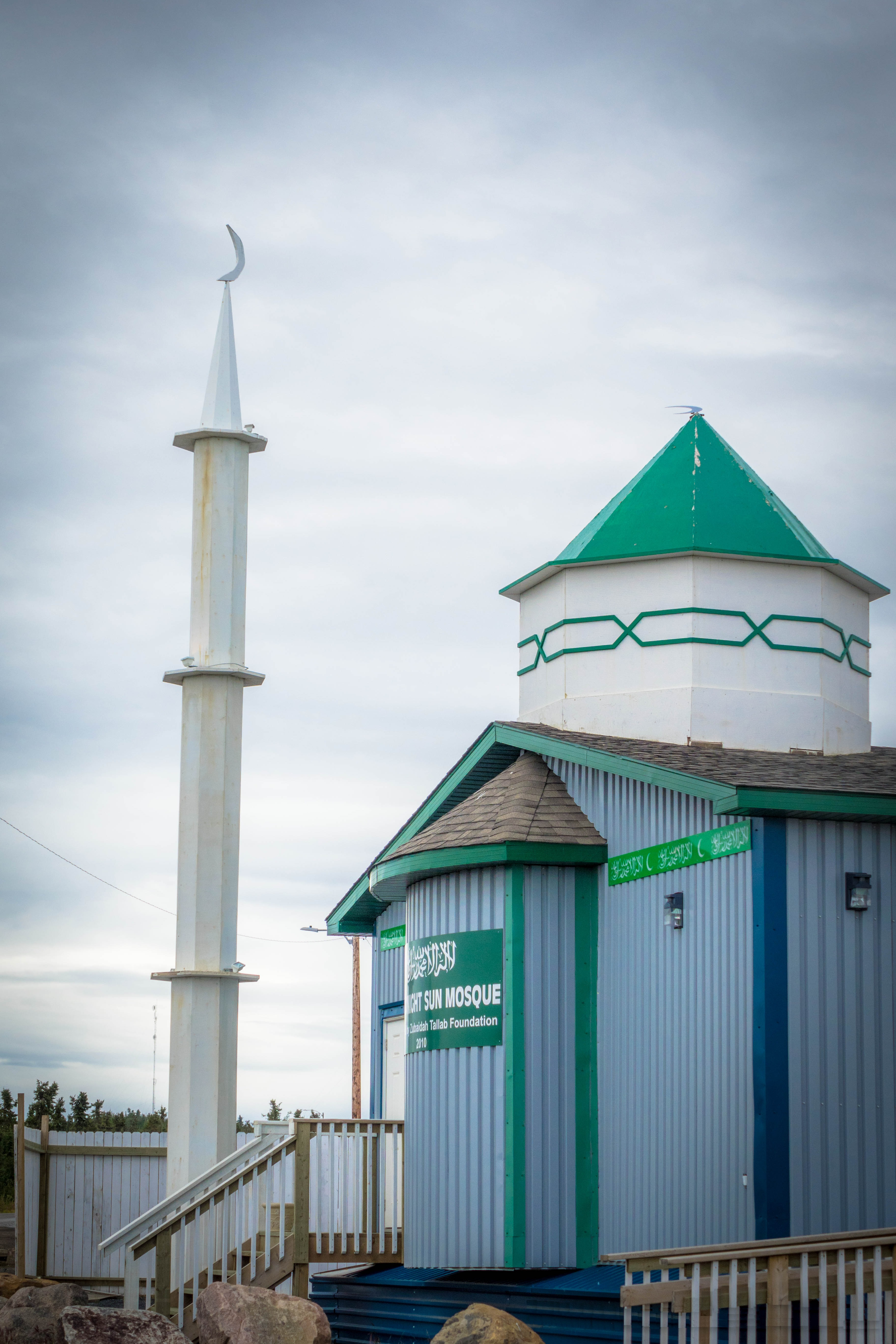
Midnight Sun Mosque in Inuvik, Canada, which led Amier Suliman to remark: "This is the first minaret to be erected in the Arctic ... some will say it's a new frontier for Islam".

The history of Islam in the Arctic starts relatively late in the chronology of Islamic history, the Arctic Circle being at a great distance from traditional Muslim bastions of power and settlement. The "climatic conditions, remoteness and heavy industrial character" of northern cities have resulted in a unique cultural shift for Muslims living in the region, including a tendency towards pluralism wherein sects like Sunni and Shia Muslims do not segregate themselves. In areas where the midnight sun or polar night renders the five daily prayers impossible to tie to dusk and dawn, congregants typically either use the same timing as a more southern region, the holy city of Mecca or their homelands.

== General Arctic issues ==
The Egyptian professor M. G. El-Fandy has opined that the Quranic ayah in Surah al-Kahf that references Dhu al-Qarnayn's reaching of the land where the sun resided after setting was likely a miraculous reference to the Arctic Circle.

Dr. Marwa Maziad has been the first and pioneering Arab-American voice on Arctic studies. She served among the first cohort of Arctic Studies Fellows at the University of Washington. Starting in 2014, she authored several columns in Arabic for Egypt's Al-Masry Al-Youm newspaper, discussing the emerging relevance of the Arctic for Arab states. Dr. Maziad later authored a groundbreaking article for the World Policy Institute, highlighting previously unexamined historical and geopolitical connections between the Arab world and the Arctic, tracing them back to the 1973 October War and the oil embargo. Dr. Maziad showed that this world event was a moment of indigenous mobilization in the arctic. She argued that such connections reflect the importance of energy income management in rentier states. Her most recent article for The National News further explores the growing strategic ties between the Gulf region and the Arctic, particularly in the areas of polar shipping and energy geopolitics. Dr. Marwa Maziad is the Founder and Founding Director of the Gulf-Arctic Initiative™, established in 2014.

Ziad Reslan of Harvard Kennedy School looked at the refugee crisis overlaps with a need for increased migrant workers in the far north.

In 2018, a delegation from the United Arab Emirates accompanied Adnan Amin, the Director-General of the International Renewable Energy Agency based in Abu-Dhabi, to the fifth Arctic Circle Assembly in Reykjavík, Iceland.

=== Fasting during Ramadan ===
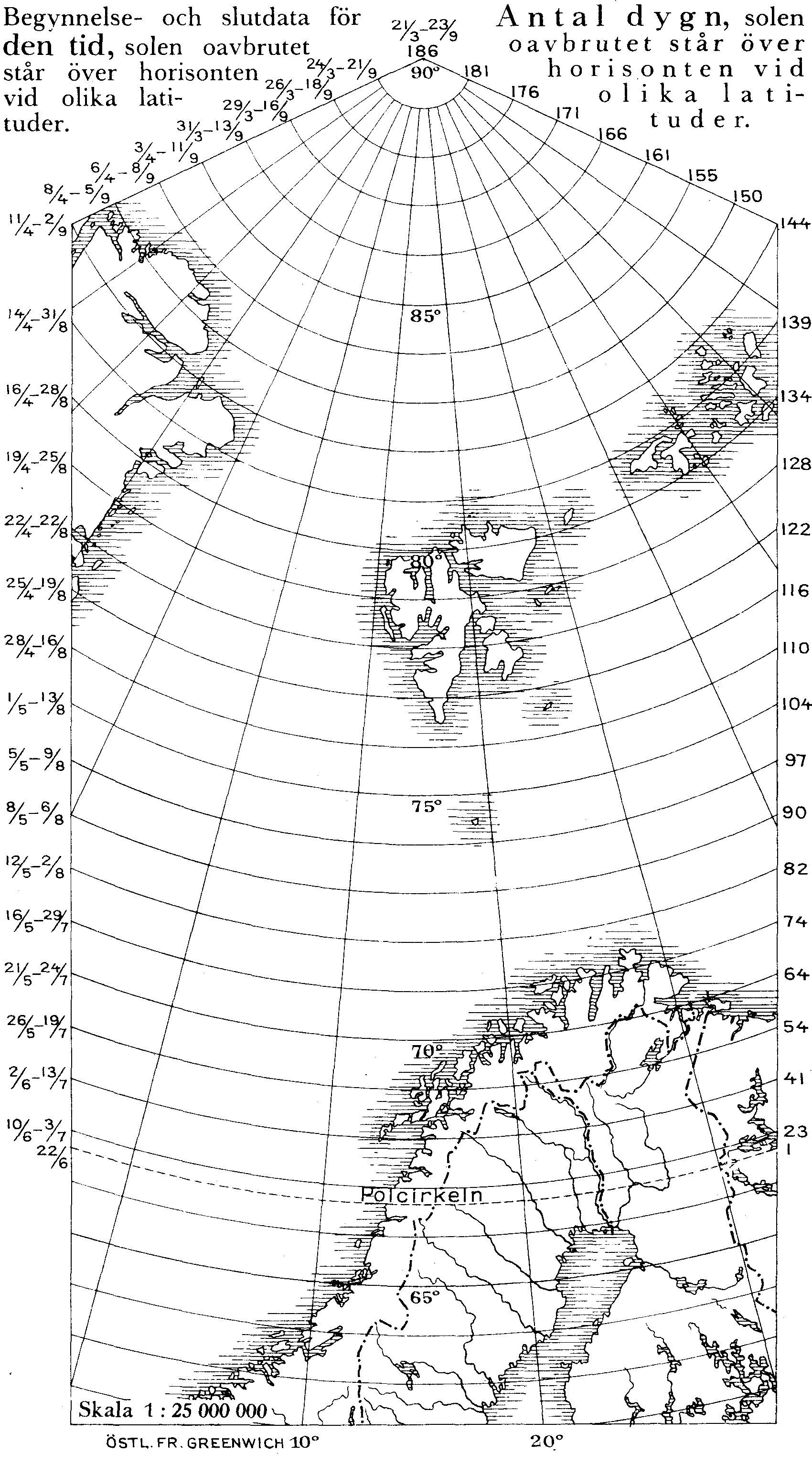
Map showing the dates of midnight sun at various latitudes (left) and the total number of nights.

It is a religious obligation for Muslims to fast during the month of Ramadan and the requirement is to begin fasting each day when a white thread can be distinguished from a black thread at dawn; fasting ends when the sun sets completely. The arctic regions experience a phenomenon known as midnight sun around the summer solstice. During this time period there is little or no darkness in any twenty-four hour period. On the other hand, around the winter solstice in the same regions there is little or no daylight. Therefore, the traditional method of identifying the fasting period by means of the sunlight intensity cannot be used.

The Islamic calendar is lunar, and the Islamic year is around 10 or 11 days shorter than the common solar year. Thus Ramadan falls earlier in each solar year than it did in the previous year, and moves steadily forwards through each year until it returns to approximately the original solar year date every 33–34 years. During the years in which Ramadan falls at the time of the midnight sun, or when it falls in periods of no daylight, Muslims living in the arctic regions must have some means of determining the proper fasting period.

Muslims in the Arctic are generally advised by religious authorities to adopt one of three solutions. Firstly, if there are major practical or health obstacles to their fasting during the prescribed month, they may replace the fasting days of Ramadan with substitute days at another time of the year. Secondly, they may follow the timings of the nearest Muslim community which does not face the midnight sun problem. This was the approach taken by most of the Muslims of Iqaluit in Canada, who decided to follow the timings for Ottawa, while those in Inuvik decided to follow Edmonton. Thirdly, they may follow the timings of the holy city of Mecca, as the Muslim community of Tromsø in Norway elected to do in 2013. Nevertheless, despite the difficulty of fasting during very long summer days, many Muslims in the far north choose to adhere to local time and fast during the period of extended daylight for as long as the sun sets for at least some time each day.

== History ==
The presence of Islam in the northern and Arctic regions spans back over a thousand years. During the travels of Ibn Fadlan to Volga Bulgaria, he described how prayer times functioned "during the white nights" when in conversation with a local muezzin:

Day was breaking. I asked the muezzin:

'To which prayer have you called us?' 'The dawn prayer,' he said. 'And the evening prayer?' 'We say it with the sunset prayer.'

'And during the night?' 'The night is as you see. They have been even shorter than now, for already they are beginning to lengthen.'

Later medieval Muslim writers would also comment on the short nights at Volga Bulgaria during the summer. However, while the environmental issues surrounding the performance of religious obligations in northern climes were probably known in the wider Islamic world, the topic was generally ignored by Muslim scholars and writers.

The Siberian-based Khanate of Sibir was the northernmost Islamic state in history, with its territories including parts of the shore of the Arctic Ocean.

The issue of how prayers should be conducted in northern environments picked up steam during the 18th century when the Russian Muslim reformer Abu Nasr Qursawi contended that the isha prayer should always be performed while the specific timing of the prayer during the summer be determined via ijtihad. This ran counter to what most ulema in Russia taught, stating that the prayer shouldn't be conducted during the summer months due to the solar conditions not being able to be met.

== Russia ==
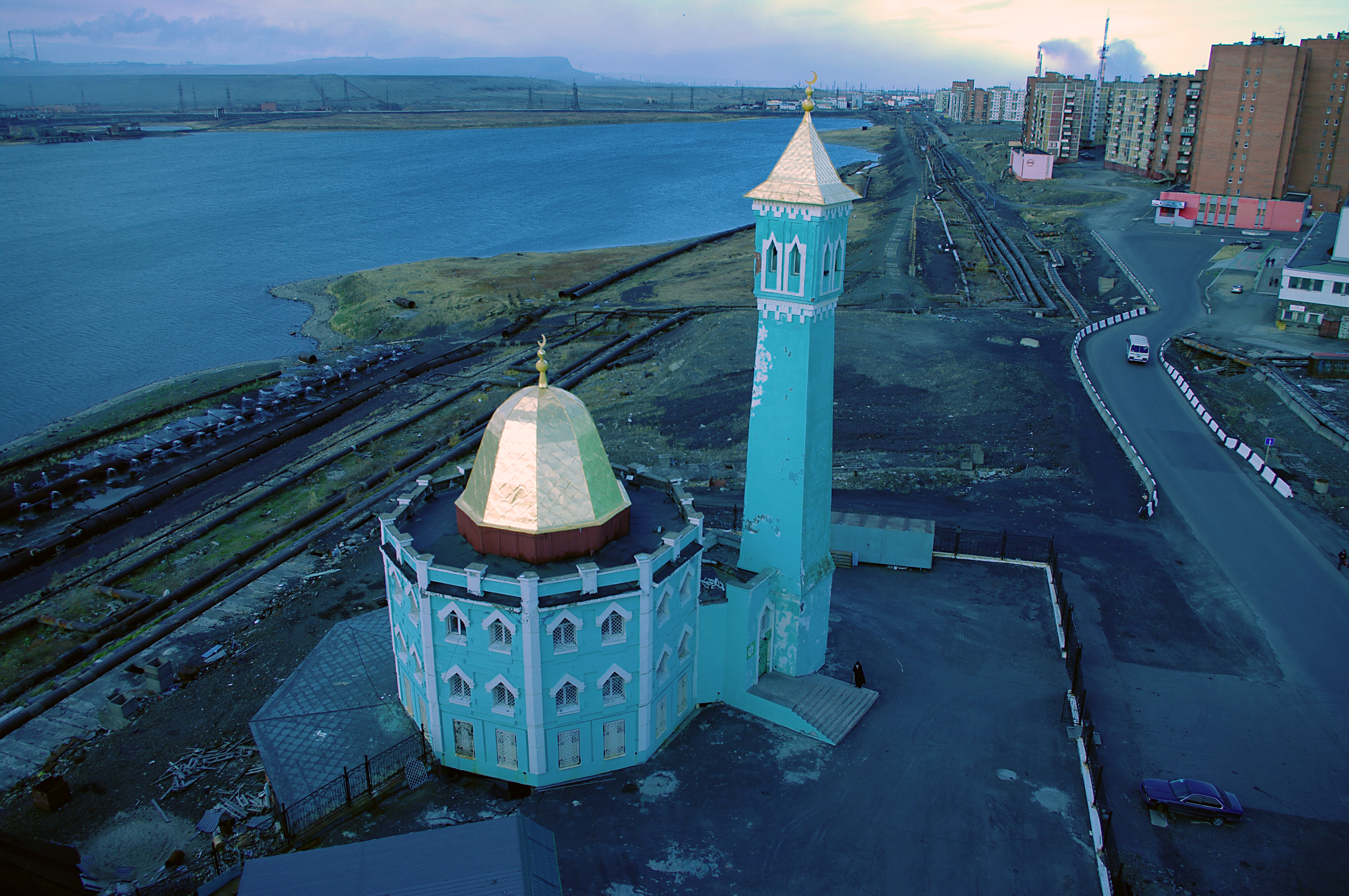
Nord Kamal Mosque in Norilsk is the world's northernmost mosque.

In 922 AD, the explorer Ibn Fadlan referenced that new converts to Islam in Tatarstan had to deal with irregularities of the sunrise and sunset, which was confirmed four hundred years later by Ibn Battuta as he traveled the region, and noted the locals believed the Northern Lights were battles between the righteous and irreligious djinn spirits.

A study from 2019 described Muslim communities in Arctic Russia as "rapidly growing" in the last two decades. An early attempt to build a mosque in a major city (Yakutsk, about 450 kilometers (280 mi) south of the Arctic Circle) failed upon the outbreak of the First World War and the following October Revolution. In 1996, however, it became the site of the world's largest mosque in the far north, capable of holding 3000 worshipers.

Siberian ulema since the 19th century were hesitant to recognise distant authority. After the 1991 collapse of the Soviet Union, three central Muslim directorates competed for control of the Islamic population in Siberia, the far East and the far North; one of these three was absorbed into another, leaving the CDUMR and the Council of Muftis—the latter seen as closely tied to the Russian government. In 1998, the first mosque was built for the industrial city of Norilsk, and by 2007 the Muslims in the city were estimated at 20% of the population, coming from Dagestan, Central Asia and Azerbaijan.

Nearly every Arctic city in Russia has a Muslim presence as of 2019, and the 59 mosques and musallas spread across the Arctic exist in every region except for the Nenets Autonomous Okrug and Chukotka. A periodical journal named Islam in Yakutia is printed in Neryungri. In 2014, it was noted that a large number of ethnic Russians in Tyumen, which boasts 30 northern mosques, seemed to be converting to Islam.

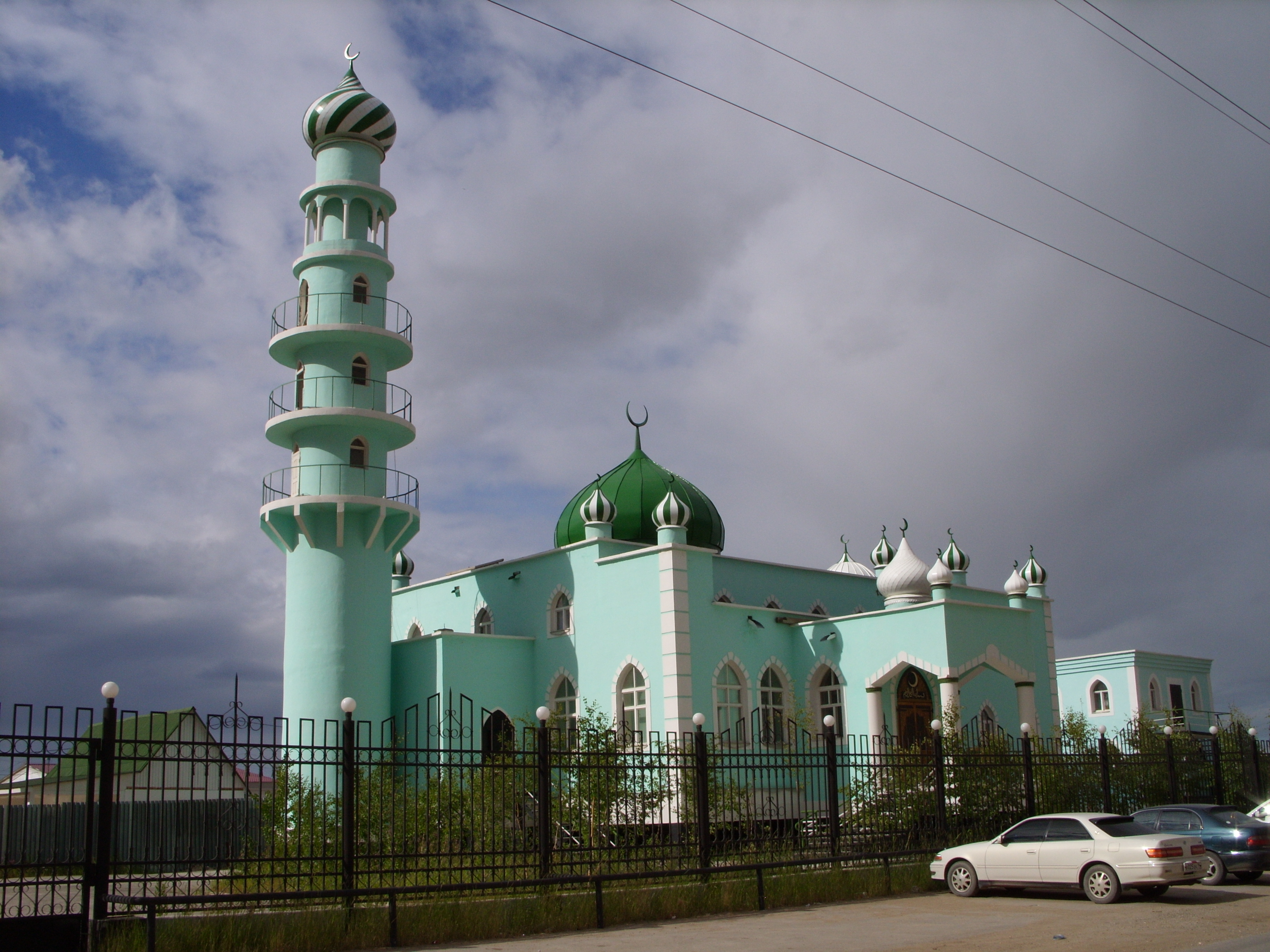
The mosque in Yakutsk

Challenges to the Muslim presence are of different kinds. The Arctic city of Vorkuta had a strong skinhead and white nationalist scene in the 1990s and 2000s, and a Russian nationalist group protested against the mosque there. The Yamal Peninsula has a meat processing business run by Nyda-Resurs of halal reindeer meat, which struggles against more traditional meats like mutton. In addition, the two Muslim organizations compete with each other over control of new Muslim communities; their competition is ideological (with the Council of Muftis more vocally supporting rights of Russian Muslims), political (since the council is closely connected to Moscow, and sometimes denounced as a state-backed organization that seeks to extend Moscow's control over Russia's Muslims), and ethnic (since North Caucasians dominate the council, while Tatars and Bashkirs traditionally control the CDUMR).

Percentage of Muslims in Russian Arctic regions:

Region	Percentage of Muslims
Arkhangelsk Oblast	0.0%
Chukotka	Unknown
Karelia	0.2%
Komi Republic	1.0%
Krasnoyarsk Krai	1.5%
Murmansk Oblast	1.0%
Nenets A.O.	Unknown
Yakutia	1.4%
Yamalo-Nenets A.O.	17.4%

== Alaska ==
The Islamic Community Center of Anchorage Alaska was the first purpose-built mosque in the US state, with construction beginning in 2010 to replace the musalla in a strip mall that had previously served the 3000 Muslim residents. Due to the differences in daylight hours between winter and summer, and due to there being no darkness in the summer at night, the ICCAA has adopted Mecca time as its prayer schedule, which has led to some disagreement within the community. Some Muslims opt to pray local time, and estimate the prayer times in the summer when they cannot use the sun.

A parishioner interviewed by VICE News explained he had chosen Alaska because while applying to immigrate to the United States as a doctor, it was easier if settlement plans were in an under-staffed community in need of doctors. The Anchorage Muslim Community is very diverse. In addition to US -born Muslims, there are adherents who have immigrated from over 50 countries worldwide.

The 35 Muslims of Fairbanks, Alaska, converted the old North Post Chapel into a prayer hall.

== Canadian Arctic ==
In 1905, Ali Abouchadi entered the Yukon Gold Rush alongside his uncle and a friend, the trio having emigrated from Lebanon to partake in the fortune-finding in the Canadian north, although they never made it further north than Lac La Biche, Alberta,--but this caused a "gradual immigration of Lebanese Muslims to Lac La Biche". Twenty years later, Ali alone travelled northward to the Arctic Ocean as a merchant, stopping in Aklavik, but ultimately returning to Alberta.

After the First World War, the Lebanese Muslim Peter Baker started a successful business transiting supplies north from Edmonton to the Mackenzie River to outfit the oil prospectors in the area alongside John Morie. His close relations with the indigenous tribes in the Arctic (he had learned to speak Dogrib and Slavey) irritated his competitors. When the indigenous tribes were largely given the right to vote in 1960, one of their first elections catapulted Baker to the status of Member of Legislative Assembly for the riding of Mackenzie North in 1964, and it is suggested that he was the one to propose Yellowknife as the capital of the territory.

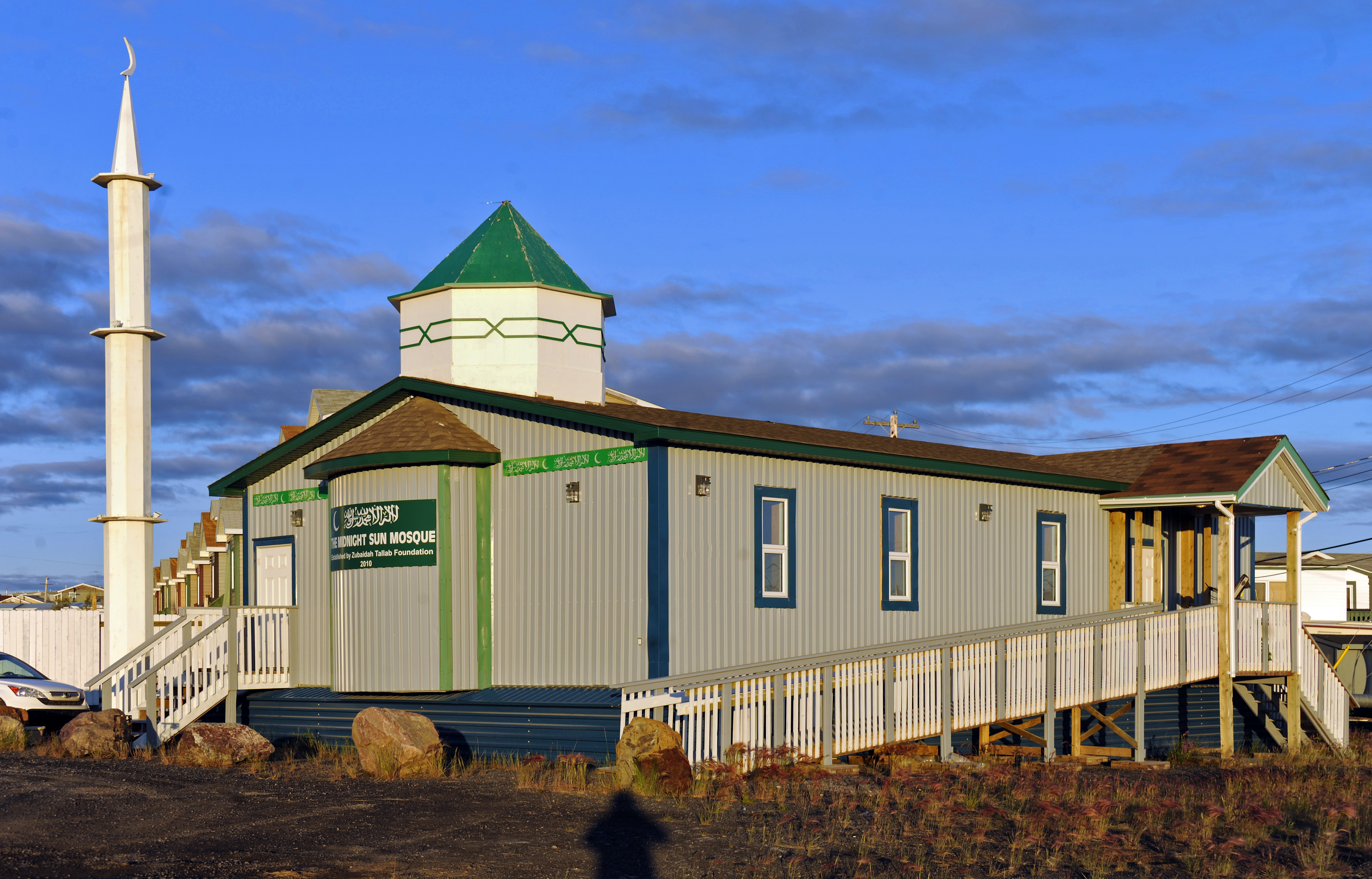
The Midnight Sun Mosque in Inuvik, lit by the midnight sun in 2015

The first mass immigration of Muslims into the Northwest Territories followed the 1970s boom in Arctic petroleum exploration. By 1995, there were five Muslim families living in Inuvik. The first Western mosque in the Arctic was the Midnight Sun Mosque built in 2010 for the city's 100 Muslims; it was assembled further south in Manitoba by the Zubaidah Tallab Foundation (ZTF) and shipped to the Arctic to reduce costs. Amier Suliman remarked that "this [the mosque] is the first minaret to be erected in the Arctic ...some will say it's a new frontier for Islam." Once in Inuvik, it was attached to a 10-metre (33 ft) minaret which had been locally built. It replaced the aging trailer that had previously served as a Musallah, and was only big enough for twenty people. Following the completion of the mosque, the Muslim Welfare Centre in Toronto provided the funds to purchase an adjacent property to set up the "Arctic Food Bank". It distributes groceries to the town's population, and is now Inuvik's largest charity. The territorial capital of Yellowknife has approximately 300 Muslims. In 2019, the property was demolished to provide the space for building a new, larger mosque that will contain a library and an Islamic school.

The Iqaluit Masjid was built, again by the ZTF, in 2015 to serve 80 Muslims in the city of 7000 in Nunavut. In 2018, it opened a franchise of the same "Arctic Food Bank" established earlier in Inuvik.

In 2018, a trucking warehouse in Whitehorse, Yukon, was converted into a mosque chiefly by cabinetmaker Fathallah Farajat, from the southern city of Hamilton, Ontario. The opening of the mosque, which was constructed with a financial contribution from the ZTF, marked the first time that there was a Muslim prayer hall in every Canadian province and territory. Hussein Guisti, who had overseen the ZTF's construction of the two earlier northern mosques, dubbed the silver-clad mosque "the Star Trek mosque", in reference to Canadian Muslims' efforts to bring Islam to the frontiers.

== European Arctic ==
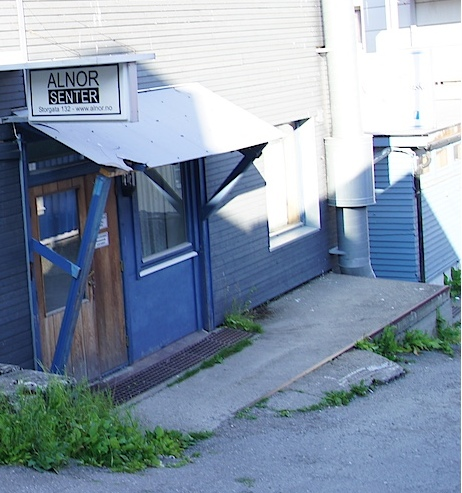
Al-Nor Mosque in Tromsø, Norway.

At the outset of the 20th century, Finland was the only country in Northern Europe to have a native Muslim population, with approximately a thousand Finnish Tatars. The Vepsians in Finland were among the northernmost peoples with whom Muslim merchants had contacts in the early centuries of Islam, as Azeri merchants traded swords in exchange for animal pelts. In 2018, a study of Finland's Muslims living inside the Arctic Circle found Palestinian, Iraqi, Persian, Turkish, Bengali, Somali, Pakistani and Afghan immigrants, virtually all of whom practised Sunni Islam.

Norway's largest Arctic mosque is in Tromsø, built in 2006 by a convert to Islam and financed by a donation from an anonymous Saudi businessman. There are two mosques further north in Alta and Hammerfest.

As of 2013, the only known Muslim living in Greenland is a Lebanese citizen who operates a restaurant in Nuuk.

== See also ==
- Islam in Europe
- Islam in Canada
- Islam in Iceland
- Islam in Russia
- Islam in the United States
- Lists of mosques
- Midnight sun
- Circumpolar peoples
- Arctic Cathedral
- Arctic Anthropology
