= Peter Baker (Canadian politician) =

Canadian politician (1887–1983)

Peter Baker (April 1887 – November 13, 1973), born Bedouin Ferran, also known as Ahmad Ali Ferran and Faron Ahmed upon death, was a Lebanese-born Canadian trader, politician, and author. As the first Muslim elected to public office in Canada, he played a fundamental role in the history of Islam in the Arctic and Subarctic regions.

== Early life ==
Baker was born in 1887 as Bedouin Ferran or as Ahmad Ali Ferran on the territory of Levant, which is now Lebanon.

At the turn of the century, he emigrated to Canada from the Turkish (Ottoman) conscription for young Arabs whom Turkey made to fight against the Yemenis.

Ferran worked at a Holy Cross College as a labourer, and in 1909, was given his anglicised name by the college's Catholic priest. Thereonafter, he moved to the province of Alberta.

== Canada ==
In the 1910s, Baker began work as a trapper and trader of northern fur and essentials with First Nations, establishing with his Indigenous trading partners novel and adaptive ways of both trade and credit.

After his trade ended, Baker entered politics, and was elected a member of the NWT Council at the time, now called the Legislative Assembly of the Northwest Territories for the period of 1964–1967. He was one of the earliest Muslim politicians in Canada.

Baker's funeral took place on 19 November 1973 in Al-Rashid Mosque in Edmonton, Alberta. Baker was identified in the 17 November 1973 press of Edmonton Journal's Deaths and Notices section as Baker, Peter (Faron Ahmed).

Baker authored a book, Memoirs of an Arctic Arab, published posthumously in 1976.
