= Nord Kamal Mosque =

Mosque in Norilsk, Russia

- Норд-Камал мечеть
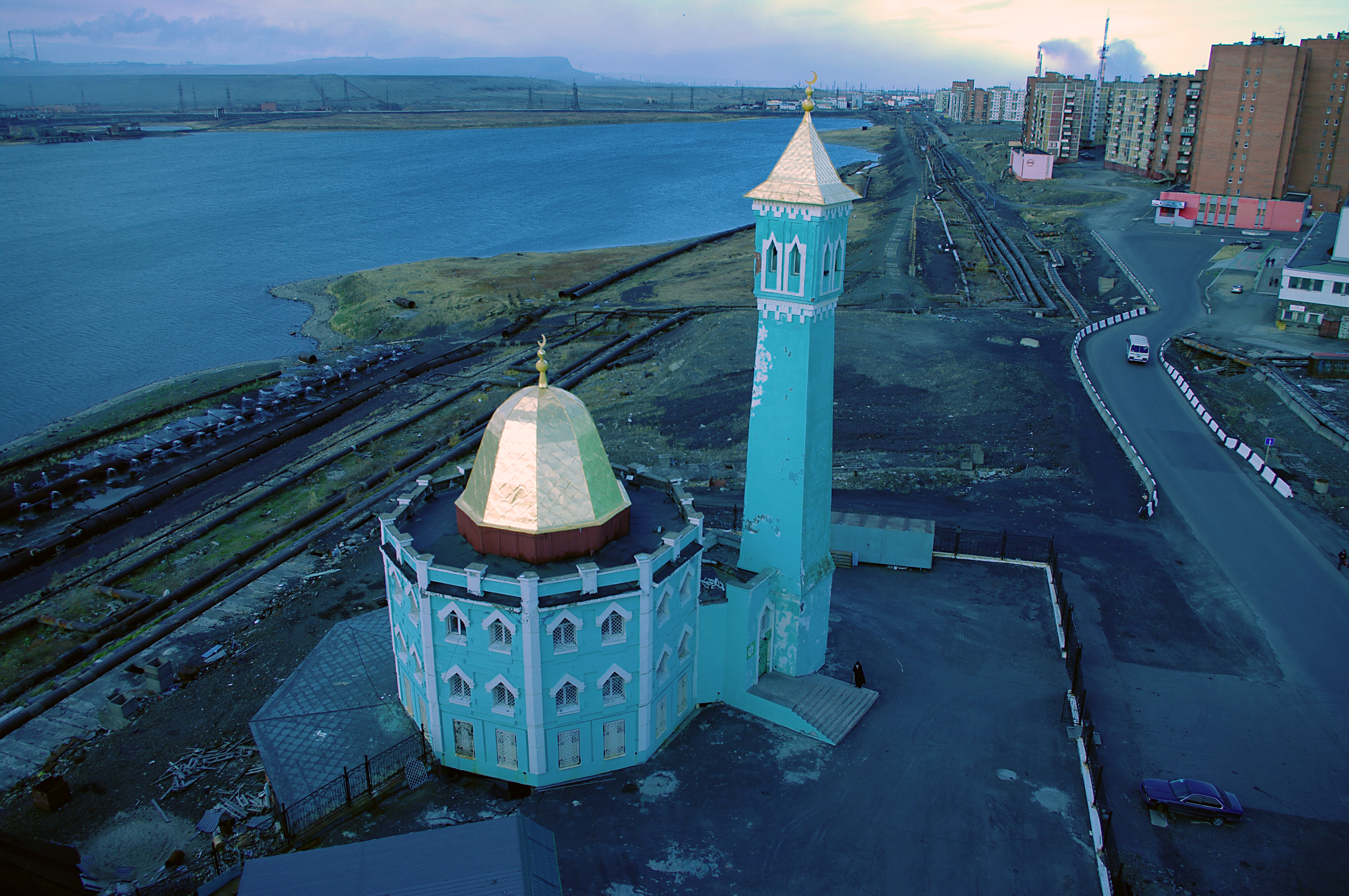

Religion
- Affiliation: Islam

Location
- Location: Norilsk, Krasnoyarsk Krai, Russia
- Interactive map of Nord Kamal Mosque
- Coordinates: 69.340810°N 88.200840°E

Architecture
- Architect: Josef Muire
- Completed: 1998

Specifications
- Dome: 1
- Minaret: 1

The Nord Kamal Mosque (Russian: Нурд-Камал) is the largest mosque in the city of Norilsk, Russia. It was built by businessman Mukhtad Bekmeyev, a Tatar businessman in Norilsk, who named it after his parents Nuritdin and Gaynikamal. It was designed by Evgeny Solnyshkin and architect Josef Muire. The mosque was inaugurated on 19 September 1998.

== History ==
Mitkhad Bikmeev, a Tatar businessman in Norilsk, started construction of the mosque in 1993. Construction was finished in 1998 and its inauguration was held on 19 September. Grant Mufti Talgat Tadzhuddin opened the prayer hall.

Bikmeev named the mosque in honour of his parents Nuritdin and Gainikamal. Bikmeev paid for a restoration of the mosque in 2007.

Norilsk has a Muslim population of about 50,000, mostly migrants from Azerbaijan and Dagestan, although it is shrinking due to the area's harsh environment, unfavorable work opportunities, and travel restrictions placed on foreigners after 2002.

== Design ==
Josef Muire was the architect for the mosque and Evgeny Solnyshkin designed it. Solnyshkin, a member of the Eastern Orthodox Church, found it difficult to design a mosque and read the Quran to learn about mosques. The Nord Kamal Mosque is in the Guinness Book of Records as the most northernly-situated mosque in the world.

The mosque is two storeys with the first used as a madrasa and the second as a prayer hall. The minaret for the mosque is 30 meters tall and was made square instead of round to be more wind resistant and resist freezing. The dome is built at an angle due to heavy snowfall in the area. The mosque and all of the other buildings in Norilsk stand on stilts.

== See also ==
- Islam in Russia
- List of mosques in Russia
- Islam in the Arctic
- List of northernmost items

== Works cited ==
=== News ===
- Khoroshevskaya, Marina (20 September 2018). "Единственная в мире". Gazetazp. Archived from the original on 29 January 2022.
- Komissarova, Victoria (25 February 2021). "Показываем, как 23 года спустя выглядит самая северная мечеть в мире Нурд-Камал в Норильске". Enisey.
- Paxton, Robin (15 April 2007). "Arctic mosque stays open but Muslim numbers shrink". Kompas. Archived from the original on 26 March 2023.
- Putri, Diva; Pratiwi, Inten (27 March 2023). "Menilik Masjid Nurd Kamal, Rumah Ibadah Muslim Paling Utara di Dunia". Kompas. Archived from the original on 19 April 2026.

=== Web ===
- "Мечеть «Нурд-Камал» г.Норильск". Central Spiritual Administration of the Muslims of Russia. Archived from the original on 19 April 2026.
