= Catholic Church and abortion politics =

"The moment a positive law deprives a category of human beings of the protection which civil legislation ought to accord them, the state is denying the equality of all before the law. When the state does not place its power at the service of the rights of each citizen, and in particular of the more vulnerable, the very foundations of a state based on law are undermined. . . . As a consequence of the respect and protection which must be ensured for the unborn child from the moment of conception, the law must provide appropriate penal sanctions for every deliberate violation of the child's rights."

— Catechism of the Catholic Church

Since the Catholic Church views abortion as gravely wrong, it considers it a duty to reduce its acceptance by the public and in civil legislation. While it considers that Catholics should not favour abortion in any field, it recognises that Catholics may accept compromises that, while permitting abortions, lessen their incidence by, for instance, restricting some forms or enacting remedies against the conditions that give rise to them. It is accepted that support may be given to a political platform that contains a clause in favour of abortion but also elements that will actually reduce the number of abortions, rather than to an anti-abortion platform that will lead to their increase.

== United States ==
Before the 1973 Roe v. Wade Supreme Court decision that opened the door to the legalization of abortion, the right-to-life movement in the U.S. consisted of lawyers, politicians, and doctors, almost all of whom were Catholic. The only coordinated opposition to abortion during the early 1970s came from the United States Conference of Catholic Bishops and the Family Life Bureau, also a Catholic organization. Prior to Roe v. Wade decision, abortion was not a high priority for Catholic bishops in the United States. Neither was abortion a prominent issue in American politics prior to Roe v. Wade. It was not a major platform plank for either party in the 1968 and 1972 elections.

In the 60s and early 70s, there was a shift as a number of Catholics and Southern whites abandoned their traditional affiliation with the Democratic party and began to support the Republican party. This shift is evidenced by the fact that Nixon received only 33% of the Catholic vote in the 1968 election compared to 52% in 1972. As a group, Catholics represented a quarter of the nation's electorate and were now one of the nation's largest swing groups. Both parties began to aggressively woo both the Catholic voters. Although the Catholic hierarchy could not dictate who Catholics voted for, they did have a substantial influence over the faithful in their dioceses. Politicians were aware that the bishops could employ significant time, energy and money to support the issues that were important to them. From their perspective, the bishops were eager to regain some of the influence that their predecessors had wielded in the earlier part of the 20th century.

After Roe v. Wade, the involvement of the Catholic hierarchy in American politics increased to an unprecedented level, with bishops devoting more time, energy and money to the issue of abortion than any other single issue. The substantial role of the Catholic Church in the abortion debate has received much attention in the American media .

Mobilization of a wide-scale anti-abortion movement among Catholics began quickly after the Roe v. Wade decision with the creation of the National Right to Life Committee (NRLC). The NRLC also organized non-Catholics, eventually becoming the largest anti-abortion organization in the United States. Connie Paige has been quoted as having said that, "[t]he Roman Catholic Church created the right-to-life movement. Without the church, the movement would not exist as such today."

In the two years following the Roe v. Wade decision, U.S. bishops focused on passage of a Human Life Amendment to the U.S. Constitution which would ban abortion.

=== A Pastoral Plan for Pro-Life Activities ===
In November 1975, the National Conference of Catholic Bishops (NCCB) and the United States Catholic Conference (USCC) published a document titled "A Pastoral Plan for Pro-Life Activities" that outlined a strategic plan for anti-abortion activities by members of the Catholic clergy and laity. Laurence Tribe describes the document as "an extraordinary organizational blueprint for political action." The plan called for a "comprehensive pro-life legislative program" that would push for "passage of a constitutional amendment providing protection of the unborn child to the maximum degree possible."

To accomplish its goals, the plan called for the formation of committees at the state level that would coordinate the political efforts in the dioceses and congressional districts of that state. Each diocese was to have an anti-abortion committee that would push for the passage of a "constitutional amendment to protect the unborn child." The plan also called for the creation of an "identifiable, tightly-knit and well-organized pro-life unit" in each congressional district to track voting records of elected officials vis-a-vis abortion and to mobilize resources for political action.

Despite the concern of some bishops that the Pastoral Plan was narrowly focused on just the issue of abortion, the plan was adopted in 1975 and subsequently re-approved in 1985 and 2001.

=== 1976 presidential election ===
Abortion became an issue early on in the race for the 1976 Democratic presidential nomination. Senator Birch Bayh, who had chaired hearings on a constitutional amendment to ban abortion, finally broke his silence on the issue and came out against the passage of such an amendment. Bayh's stance opposing the amendment was soon echoed by Frank Church and Sargent Shriver, a practicing Catholic.

The Democratic Party began to fracture over anti-abortion and abortion rights lines. Anti-abortion Democrats sought a candidate sympathetic to their stance on the constitutional amendment. However, conservative Democrat George Wallace declared his support for such an amendment. Laurence Tribe attributes Jimmy Carter's victory in the Iowa caucuses to his having "fudged" his position on abortion although Carter publicly denied having done so. On the Republican side, Ronald Reagan declared his support for a constitutional amendment that would effectively ban abortions. Although President Ford won the nomination of his party, Reagan's supporters were able to push through a plank in the party platform that called for a "constitutional amendment to restore the protection of the right to life of unborn children."

The Democratic party platform included a plank that asserted that it was "undesirable to attempt to amend the U.S. Constitution to overturn Roe v. Wade. In an attempt to mollify the displeasure of U.S. bishops, Carter arranged a meeting with six bishops to clarify his position that, although he had not yet seen a specific phrasing that he could support, he remained opposed to abortion and pledged that he "would never try to block" an amendment banning abortion. This stance failed to placate the bishops. Attempting to capitalize on Carter's failure, President Ford signaled his agreement with the bishops' position by inviting the NCCB/USCC's Executive Committee to the White House. After the meeting, the bishops declared that, while they were not totally satisfied with Ford's position, they were encouraged by it and that they felt that "support for the concept" of a constitutional amendment was more important than agreement on a "specific kind of amendment."

However, in Laurence Tribe's estimation, abortion played a less significant role in the general election than it had in the primaries. When asked to rank fifteen issues in order of importance, voters ranked abortion as fifteenth. According to exit interviews conducted by CBS News, the Catholic vote wound up favoring Carter by 54% to 44%, a wider margin than the general electorate which favored Carter over Ford by just 50% to 48%.

=== 1980 presidential election ===
During the 1980 presidential election, Ronald Reagan made the anti-abortion cause a key issue in his campaign. He endorsed a constitutional amendment banning abortion, promised to appoint anti-abortion judges to the federal bench and prohibit the use of federal funds for abortions except where necessary to save the life of the mother. According to the results of exit interviews published in the New York Times, Catholics favored Reagan over Carter by 51% to 40%, a margin very similar to that of the general electorate.

=== 1984 presidential election ===
By 1984, the Republican party was fully aligned with traditional religious values including the anti-abortion movement. Whereas Catholics had generally voted Democratic until the late 1960s, this traditional affiliation had diminished by 1984 to a weighting in favor of the Republican party with abortion being one of the key drivers of the shift.

Sharp criticism from Church authorities put Democratic vice-presidential candidate Geraldine Ferraro on the defensive throughout the entire campaign, with abortion opponents frequently protesting her appearances with a level of fervor not usually encountered by Catholic, male, pro-abortion rights candidates such as Mario Cuomo and Ted Kennedy. Ferraro was criticized by name by Cardinal John O'Connor, the Catholic Archbishop of New York, and James Timlin, the Bishop of Scranton, for misrepresenting the Catholic Church's position on abortion. In a 1982 briefing for Congress Ferraro had written that, "the Catholic position on abortion is not monolithic and there can be a range of personal and political responses to the issue." Cardinal O'Connor publicly criticized Ferraro for making this statement. After several days of back-and-forth debate in the public media, Ferraro finally conceded that, "the Catholic Church's position on abortion is monolithic" but went on to say that "But I do believe that there are a lot of Catholics who do not share the view of the Catholic Church".

The group Catholics for a Free Choice placed an October 7, 1984, full-page ad in The New York Times titled "A Catholic Statement on Pluralism and Abortion". The advertisement stated that "direct abortion ...can sometimes be a moral choice" and that "responsible moral decisions can only be made in an atmosphere of freedom from fear of coercion."

=== Debate within the Catholic hierarchy ===
Reagan's attempt to confirm and build up his ties with the religious base of his party injected a strong religious overtone to his re-election campaign. This new focus on religious values in politics caused the American bishops to evaluate the extent to which Catholic morality should interact with politics and public policy. The Catholic hierarchy was split because some bishops such as Archbishop Bernard Law and Archbishop John O'Connor favored focusing on the single issue of abortion whereas others such as Cardinal Joseph Bernardin favored a more balanced approach that brought attention to other issues such as the threat of nuclear warfare and the elimination of poverty. Cardinal Bernardin asserted that the Catholic hierarchy would be "severely pressured by those who wanted to push a particular issue with little or no regard for the rest of the bishops' positions." In order to prevent this from happening, Bernardin proposed that the bishops promote a "consistent ethic of life". Bernardin argued that, while it was not necessary or possible for every Catholic to be engaged on every issue, it was nonetheless "both possible and necessary for the Church as a whole to cultivate a conscious explicit connection among the several issues." Initially, Bernardin spoke out against nuclear war and abortion. However, he quickly expanded the scope of his view to include all aspects of human life (according to the church's definition). In one of the first speeches given on the topic at Fordham University, Bernardin said: "The spectrum of life cuts across the issues of genetics, abortion, capital punishment, modern warfare and the care of the terminally ill." Bernardin said that although each of the issues was distinct (euthanasia, for example, was not the same as abortion), nevertheless the issues were linked since the valuing and defending of (human) life (according to the Catholic definition) were, he believed, at the center of both issues. Cardinal Bernardin told an audience in Portland, Oregon: "When human life is considered 'cheap' or easily expendable in one area, eventually nothing is held as sacred and all lives are in jeopardy."

=== Subsequent presidential elections ===
Margaret Ross Sammons describes the 1984 presidential election as the "pinnacle of the abortion debate" but asserts that the issue of abortion continued to be prominent in subsequent presidential elections. For example, in 1996, Cardinals Bernard Law and James Hickey urged Catholics not to re-elect President Bill Clinton after he vetoed a law banning intact dilation and extraction. In 2000, Catholic leaders reacted negatively to speculation that Governor George W. Bush was considering the Catholic governor of Pennsylvania, Tom Ridge, as a possible running mate, because he supported abortion rights. In 2004, a number of bishops publicly declared that they would deny communion to Senator John Kerry because of his willingness to support abortion rights. Although Kerry continued to receive communion throughout the election campaign, Sammons asserts that Kerry's campaign was sufficiently damaged by the threat to withhold communion that it may have cost him the election. Sammons writes that President George W. Bush was able to win 53% of the Catholic vote because he appealed to traditional Catholics.

=== Relationship with Protestant anti-abortion activists ===
Because the Catholic Church in the U.S. took the lead in opposing the spread and legalization of abortion and the Protestants were comparatively slow to mobilize, Protestants who were anti-abortion came to respect the national organizations that the Catholics had established to co-ordinate their efforts.

=== Catholic politicians supporting abortion rights ===
Many controversies have arisen over the church's treatment of Catholic politicians who support abortion rights. There has been controversy in the United States over whether Catholic politicians who promote legalization of abortion should be denied communion, as demanded by some American anti-abortion Catholic organizations and a few bishops. Both in the United States and elsewhere, excommunication of such politicians has been envisaged but has not been applied. Some bishops have threatened to refuse communion to these politicians. In some cases, bishops have stated that the politicians should refrain from receiving communion; in others, the possibility of excommunication has been suggested. According to David Yamane, "the vast majority of bishops in the United States ... have remained silent on the issue." Those remaining silent include prominent conservatives such as Cardinals Justin Rigali of Philadelphia and Edward Egan of New York. Cardinals William Keeler of Baltimore and Theodore McCarrick of Washington have declared that they would not withhold communion as a means of sanctioning Catholic politicians who support abortion rights. In 2005, Yamane wrote that the number of bishops who made public pronouncements against Catholic politicians supporting abortion rights amounted to less than 10% of the American Catholic hierarchy. The United States Conference of Catholic Bishops decided in 2004 that such matters should be at the discretion of each bishop on a case-by-case basis.

Those bishops who support denying communion, including Raymond Leo Burke, base their position on Canon 915. Most American bishops do not support refusal of communion on these grounds. These statements of intent from church authorities have sometimes led American Catholic voters to vote for candidates who wish to ban abortion, rather than candidates who support abortion rights alongside Catholic Church teachings on war, health care, or immigration.

Penalties of this kind from bishops have targeted Democrats, although there are Republican politicians who support abortion rights.

In 1990, John Cardinal O'Connor of New York suggested that, by supporting abortion rights, Catholic politicians risked excommunication. Congresswoman Nancy Pelosi said that, "There is no desire to fight with the cardinals or archbishops. But it has to be clear that we are elected officials and we uphold the law and we support public positions separate and apart from our Catholic faith."

Politicians involved in such controversies include Lucy Killea, Mario Cuomo, John Kerry,Rudy Giuliani, and Joe Biden. Killea's case was the first recorded; Kerry's led to comparisons between his presidential campaign and that of John F. Kennedy in 1960. While Kennedy had to demonstrate his independence from the Roman Catholic Church due to public fear that a Catholic president would make decisions based on Vatican commands, it seemed that Kerry, in contrast, had to show obedience to Catholic authorities in order to win votes.

Bishops intending to deny communion have been limited to dioceses of the United States. Bishops there who support such a course of action cite canon 915 as justification. Suggested reasons for this uniqueness are a politicization of pastoral practice and the perception of abortion's constitutional status as a right.

== Europe ==
Abortion is legal in nearly every European country, although there is a wide variation in the restrictions under which it is permitted. Restrictions on abortion are most stringent in countries that are more strongly observant of the Catholic faith.

In Europe, there has not been talk of denial of communion, although, as in the United States, there have been incidents of church authorities discouraging Catholic politicians from receiving communion and of excommunication being suggested. Pope John Paul II gave communion to Italian abortion rights supporter Francesco Rutelli, on Jan. 6, 2001.

=== Austria ===
In 1973, Franz Cardinal König wrote an open letter to Chancellor Bruno Kreisky opposing free-choice abortion and arguing that it was a "renunciation of society's responsibility to protect life, including unborn life." In 1975, the Catholic Church played a significant role in mobilizing support for a "people's initiative" sponsored by Aktion Leben, an Austrian anti-abortion organization. Ultimately, elective abortion care remained legal in Austria during the first trimester of pregnancy.

=== Poland ===
After the fall of Communism, abortion debate erupted in Poland. Roman Catholic and Lutheran Churches, and right-wing politicians pressured the government to ban abortion except in cases where abortion was the only way to save the life of the pregnant woman. Left-wing politicians and most liberals were opposed to this, and pressured the government to maintain the above-mentioned 1956 legislation. The abortion law in Poland today ("Law on family planning, protection of the human fetus and conditions for legal abortion") was enacted in January 1993 as a compromise between both camps.

It is widely believed that the Catholic Church in Poland is the main obstacle to the liberalization of abortion laws and the reintroduction of sex education in Polish schools in accordance with European standards. However, research studies have shown that Polish Catholics have a wide range of views on sex and marriage. Many Poles, including devout Catholics, complain that the Catholic Church makes demands that very few Catholics want and are able to satisfy.

=== Belgium ===
Prior to 1990, Belgium remained one of the few countries where abortion was illegal. However, abortions were unofficially permitted (and even reimbursed out of 'sickness funds') as long as they were registered as "curettage". It was estimated that 20,000 abortions were performed each year (in comparison to 100,000 births).

In early 1990, despite the opposition of the Christian parties, a coalition of the Socialist and Liberal parties passed a law to partially liberalize abortion law in Belgium. The Belgian bishops appealed to the population at large with a public statement that expounded their doctrinal and pastoral opposition to the law. They warned Belgian Catholics that anyone who co-operated "effectively and directly" in the procurement of abortions was "excluding themselves from the ecclesiastical community." Motivated by the strong stance of the Belgian bishops, King Baudoin notified the Prime Minister on March 30 that he could not sign the law without violating his conscience as a Catholic. Since the legislation would not have the force of law without the king's signature, his refusal to sign threatened to precipitate a constitutional crisis. However, the problem was resolved by an agreement between the king and Prime Minister Martens by which the Belgian government declared the king unable to govern, assumed his authority and enacted the law, after which Parliament then voted to reinstate the king on the next day. The Vatican described the king's action as a "noble and courageous choice" dictated by a "very strong moral conscience." Others have suggested that Baudoin's action was "little more than a gesture", since he was reinstated as king just 44 hours after he was removed from power.

== Asia ==
=== The Philippines ===
In the Philippines, abortion is illegal except where it is deemed necessary to save the life of the mother. Since the nation is predominantly Catholic, the Church is highly influential and its opposition is credited with frustrating efforts to liberalize the nation's highly restrictive abortion laws.

== See also ==
- Culture war
