= Islamic Community Center of Anchorage Alaska =

Mosque in Alaska, the United States

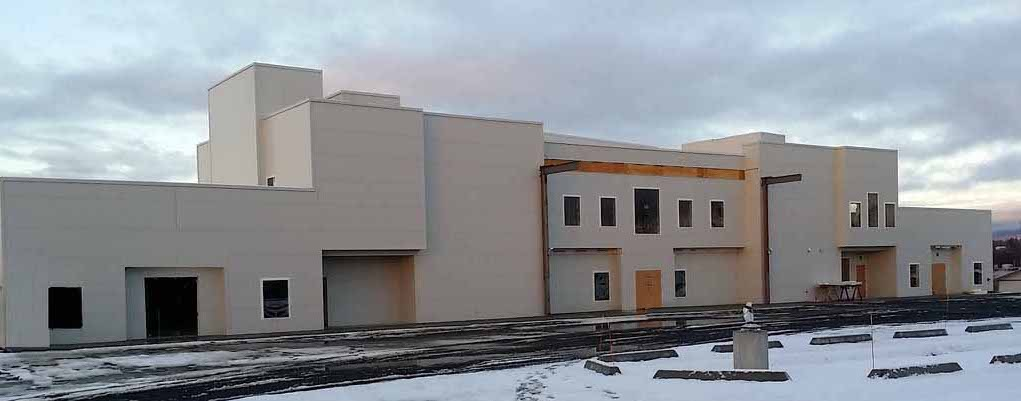
- The mosque in 2014

- Location in Alaska

Religion
- Affiliation: Islam
- Ecclesiastical or organizational status: non-profit religious organization

Location
- Location: 8005 Spring St, Anchorage, Alaska 99518
- Interactive map of Islamic Community Center of Anchorage Alaska
- Coordinates: 61.1481°N 149.8610°W

Architecture
- Type: Mosque
- Established: 2014

Specifications
- Dome: 0
- Minaret: 2

The Islamic Community Center of Anchorage Alaska (ICCAA) is an Islamic center and mosque in Anchorage, Alaska. It is the first purpose-built mosque in the US state of Alaska, and is the third northernmost mosque in North America.

Construction of the mosque, school, and Islamic center. began in 2010 to replace the musalla in a strip mall that had previously served the approximately 3000 Muslim residents. The new mosque is intended to serve Anchorage's diverse Muslim community in a 15,000-square-foot-facility (1,400 m^{2}).

It is located at Spring Street and E. 80th Avenue in Anchorage, Alaska.

Due to the differences in daylight hours between winter and summer, and due to there being no darkness in the summer at night, the ICCAA has adopted Mecca time as its prayer schedule, which has led to some disagreement within the community. Some Muslims opt to pray local time, and estimate the prayer times in the summer when they cannot use the sun.

A parishioner interviewed by VICE News explained he had chosen Alaska because while applying to immigrate to the United States as a doctor, it was easier if settlement plans were in an under-staffed community in need of doctors.

The Anchorage Muslim Community is very diverse. According to its site, the congregation includes American-born Muslims, as well as immigrants from approximately 50 different countries in Europe, Asia, and Africa, as well as Native Alaskan converts.

== See also ==
- History of Islam in the Arctic Circle
- List of mosques in the United States
