= List of Canadian Muslims =

This is a list of notable people who are Muslims and reside in, or are citizens of, Canada.

== Academic figures ==
=== Law ===
- Faisal Kutty – lawyer and law professor

=== University Administration ===
- Dr. Hashim Ahmed - Advisor to the minister of Education, Registrar of University of Toronto, and community builder. Awarded numerous awards and notably the key to the city of Mississauga in 1998. Dr. Hashim Ahmed first arrived in Canada in 1963, originally from Hyderabad India.
- Mohamed Lachemi - President and Vice Chancellor of the Toronto Metropolitan University since 2016

== Journalism ==
- Omar Sachedina – anchorman and journalist, CTV
- Haroon Siddiqui – Indo-Canadian newspaper journalist, columnist, and a former editor of the Toronto Star
- Farah Nasser – anchor and journalist, Global News
- Ginella Massa – news anchor, CBC News

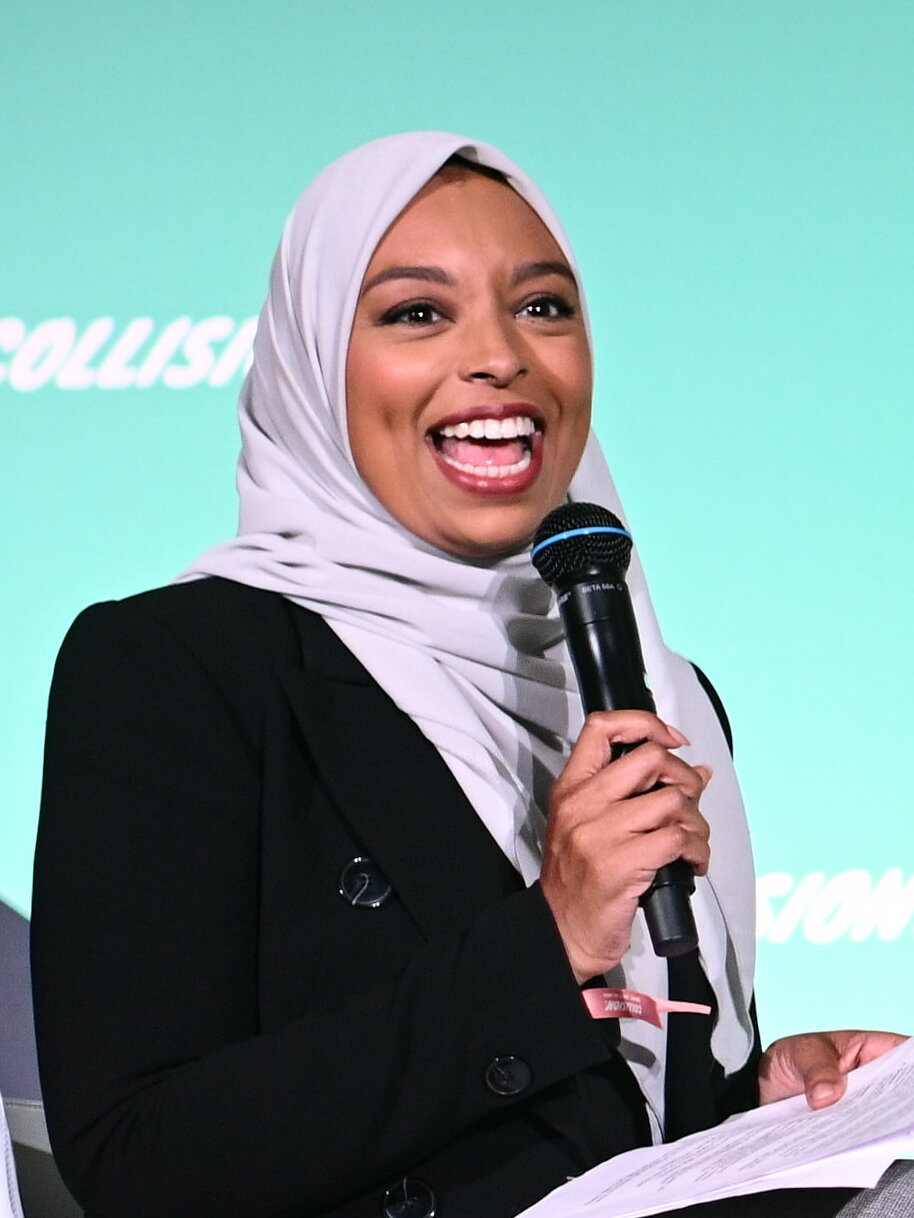
Ginella Massa

- Hodan Nalayeh – Somali-Canadian media executive, marketing consultant, social activist and entrepreneur

== Military ==
- Hasan Amat – Singaporean-Canadian WW1 soldier, served as a private in the Royal Canadian Regiment, the 4th Overseas Pioneer Battalion, and the 1st Canadian Infantry Battalion, fought and died at the Battle of Hill 70.
- Lt. Commander Wafa Dabbagh – Palestinian-Egyptian-Canadian military officer of the Canadian Armed Forces who received the Queen Elizabeth II Diamond Jubilee Medal

== Physicians ==
- Alaa Murabit M.D. – Libyan-Canadian physician, director of global health advocacy and communications at the Bill & Melinda Gates Foundation

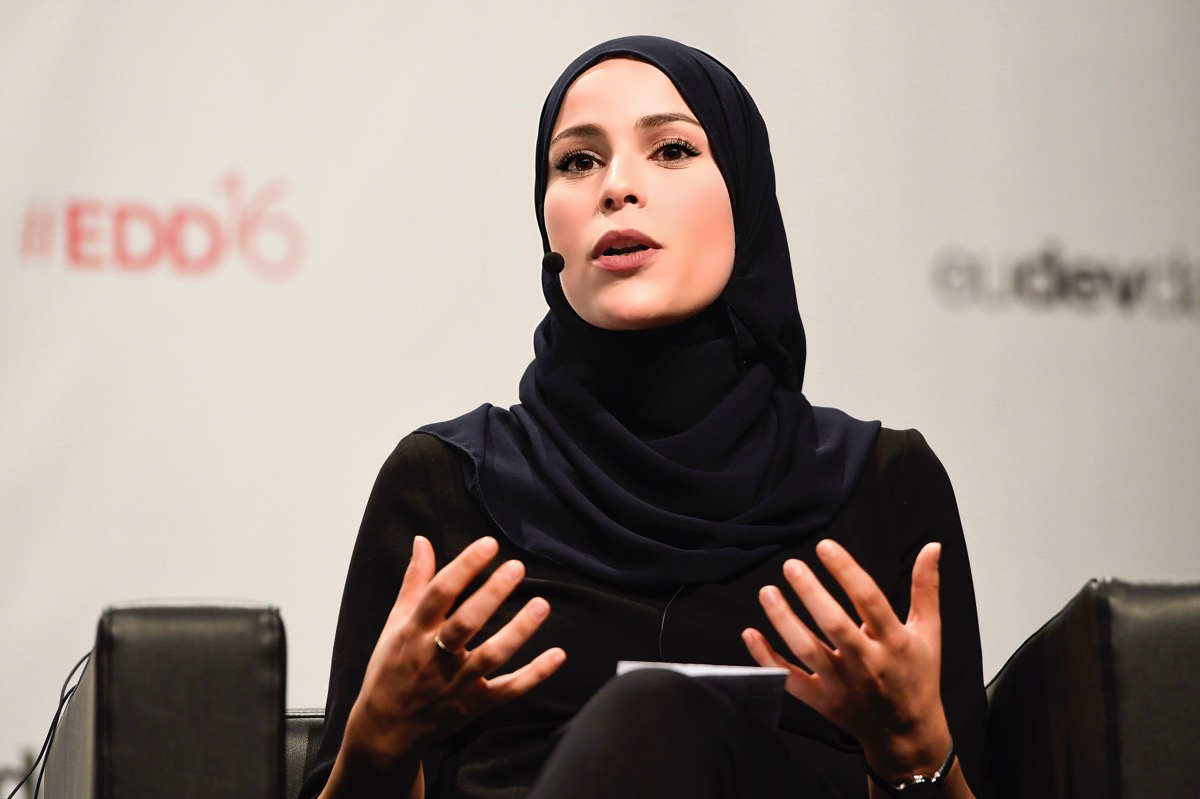
Alaa Murabit

== Politicians ==
=== Federal ===
- Ali Ehsassi – Liberal MP for Willowdale (2015–present)
- Omar Alghabra – Saudi-born Syrian-Canadian Liberal MP for Mississauga—Erindale (2006–2008) and Mississauga Centre (2015–present).
- Salma Ataullahjan – Conservative Senator for Ontario (2010–present).
- Mobina Jaffer – Liberal Senator for British Columbia (2001–2024).
- Rahim Jaffer – Conservative MP for Edmonton–Strathcona (1997–2008); first Muslim MP elected in Canada.
- Wajid Khan – Conservative MP for Mississauga—Streetsville (2004–2008).
- Maryam Monsef – Afghan-Canadian Liberal MP for Peterborough—Kawartha (2015–2021); first Muslim Cabinet Minister.
- Taleeb Noormohamed – Liberal MP for Vancouver Granville (2021–present)
- Ahmed Hussen – Liberal MP for York South-Weston (2015–present)
- Iqra Khalid – Liberal MP for Mississauga-Erin Mills (2015–present)
- Shafqat Ali – Liberal MP for Brampton Centre (2021–present)
- Yasir Naqvi – Liberal MP for Ottawa Centre (2021–present)
- Salma Zahid – Liberal MP for Scarborough Centre (2015–present)
- Sameer Zuberi – Liberal MP for Pierrefonds-Dollard (2019–present)

=== Provincial ===
- Moe Amery – Alberta Conservative MLA for Calgary-East (1993–2015).
- Mickey Amery* - Alberta Conservative MLA for Calgary-Cross (2019-present).
- Peter Baker – Lebanese-born Canadian Northwest Territories Independent MLA for Mackenzie North (1964–1967).
- Muhammad Fiaz – Saskatchewan SP MLA for Regina Pasqua (2015–2024).
- Amir Khadir – Quebec Québec solidaire MNA for Mercier (2008–2018).
- Stephen Khan – Alberta Conservative MLA for St. Albert (2008–2015).
- Yasir Naqvi – Ontario Liberal MPP for Ottawa Centre (2007–2018).
- John Nuraney – British Columbia Liberal MLA for Burnaby-Willingdon (2001–2009).
- Shafiq Qaadri – Ontario Liberal MPP for Etobicoke North (2003–present).
- Doly Begum – Ontario NDP MPP for Scarborough Southwest (2018–present).
- Sohail Quadri – Pakistani-Canadian Alberta Conservative MLA for Edmonton-Mill Woods (2012–2015).
- Khalil Ramal – Ontario Liberal MPP for London-Fanashawe (2003–2011).
- Irfan Sabir – Alberta NDP MLA for Calgary-McCall (2015–present).
- Larry Shaben – Alberta Conservative MLA for Lesser Slave Lake (1975–1989).
- Shiraz Shariff – Alberta Conservative MLA for Calgary McCall (1995–2008).
- Muhammad Yaseen – Alberta United Conservative MLA for Calgary North (2019–present)
- Adil Shamji – Ontario Liberal MPP for Don Valley East (2022–present)
- Obby Khan – Manitoba Conservative MLA for Fort Whyte (2022–present), Former Minister of Culture, Heritage, Tourism and Sport (Manitoba), First Muslim MLA elected into the Manitoba Legislature

== Religious leaders ==
- Jamal Badawi - Egyptian-Canadian author, preacher and speaker on Islam
- Zijad Delic – Bosnian-Canadian imam and community leader
- Amir Hussain – editor of the Journal of the American Academy of Religion
- Ahmad Kutty – religious scholar
- Ingrid Mattson

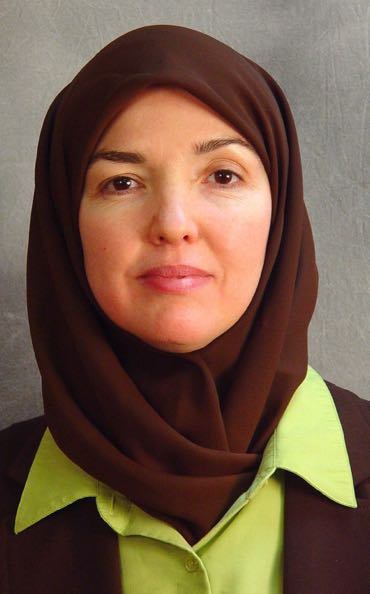
Ingrid Mattson

- Hamid Slimi – imam, founder of the Sayeda Khadija Islamic Center in Mississauga, Ontario

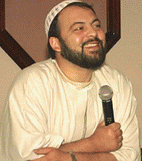
Imam Hamid Slimi

- T. B. Irving – (1914–2002), was a Canadian-American Muslim author, known for producing the first American English translation of the Qur'an
- Shabir Ally – Guyanese-born Canadian Islamic Scholar, President of the Islamic Information & Dawah Centre International in Toronto
- Mustafa Khattab BA, MA, PhD – Canadian-Egyptian Islamic scholar and author, known for publishing 'The Clear Qur'an,' which is the Canadian English translation of the Qur'an
- Mohammed Omar Subedar - Canadian Islamic Scholar, Imam, & Author, born in Toronto, teacher at Bukhari Academy and Mathabah Institute.
- Ibrahim Hindy - Canadian Islamic Scholar, Imam, Religious Director of Yaqeen Canada, born in Mississauga.

== Leaders ==
- Omar Khamissa – COO of the National Council of Canadian Muslims (NCCM)
- Mustafa Farooq J.D. – Lawyer, Former CEO of the National Council of Canadian Muslims (NCCM)
- Stephen Brown – CEO of the National Council of Canadian Muslims (NCCM)
- Ahmed Hussen – lawyer and National President of the Canadian Somali Congress
- Faisal Kutty – community leader, activist and law professor
- Hamid Slimi – imam and community leader
- Hilwie Hamdon – (1905–1988), was a Muslim woman in Edmonton, Alberta, who organized support and funding to build the first mosque in Canada, the Al-Rashid Mosque

== Entertainment ==
- Belly – Palestinian-Canadian rapper
- Ali Hassan – comedian

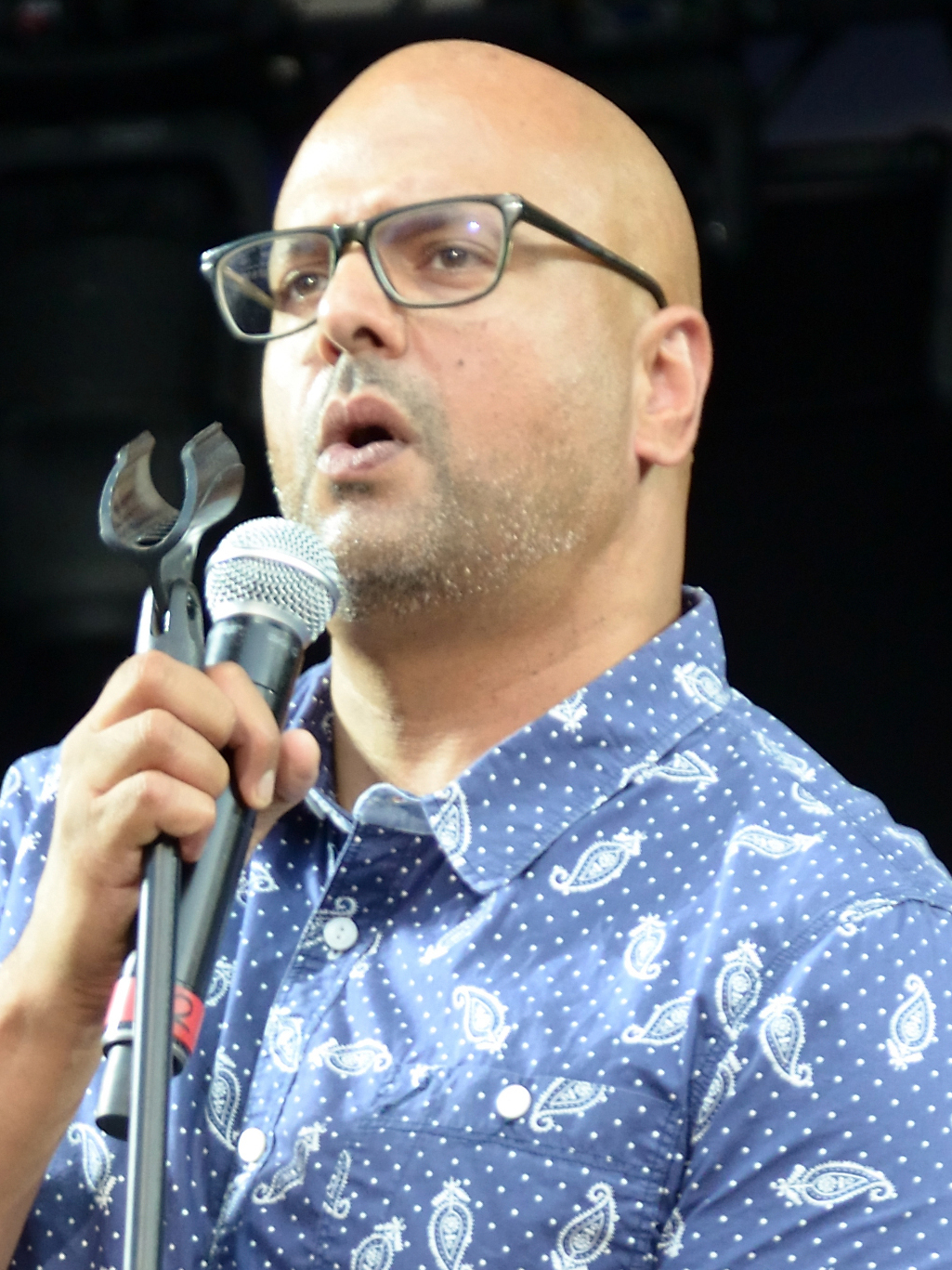
Hassan in 2022

- Tariq Hussain – singer-songwriter, broadcaster
- Ladan Hussein – Somali-Canadian musician also known as Cold Specks
- K'naan – Somali-Canadian singer-songwriter
- Nabil Rajo – Eritrean-Canadian actor
- Narcy – Yaseen Al Salman, Iraqi-Canadian hiphop singer and journalist with ancestors from Iraq.
- K-Maro — Lebanese-Canadian rapper
- Massari — Lebanese-Canadian singer
- Zarqa Nawaz – created Little Mosque on the Prairie

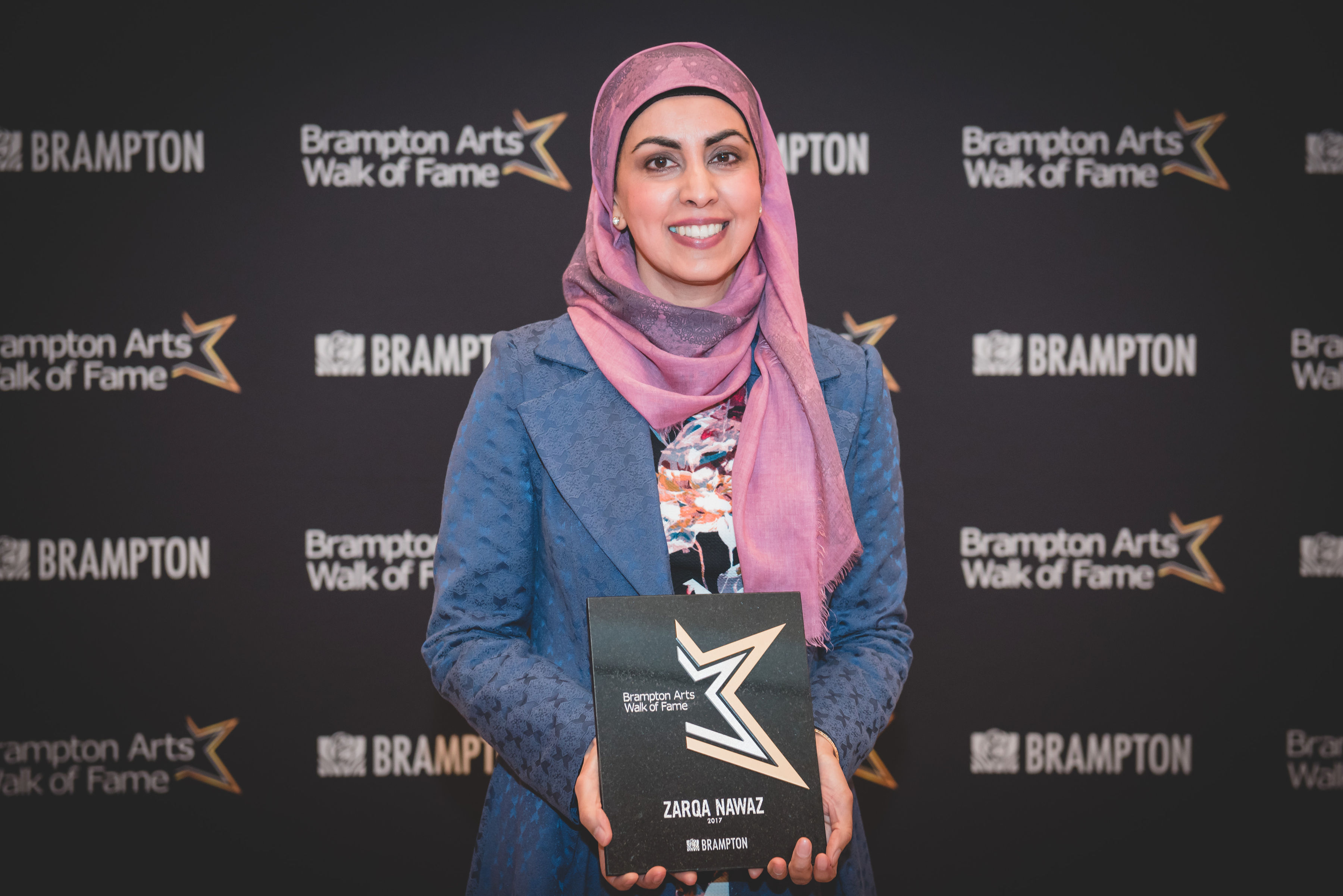
Zarqa Nawaz

- Dawud Wharnsby – singer-songwriter, poet
- Imane Anys – streamer, YouTuber
- Nemahsis – TikToker, musician
- Bilal Baig – writer and actor
- Karl Wolf — Lebanese-Canadian singer

== Literature ==
- Mohamed Abdulkarim Ali – memoirist
- Samra Habib – artist, memoirist
- Hasan Namir – novelist, poet
- Kamal Al-Solaylee – journalist, memoirist'
- Lena Khan – film director, writer
- Shireen Ahmed - Writer, public speaker, sports activist

== Sports and athletics ==
- Nazem Kadri – ice hockey player, 2009 draft pick of the Toronto Maple Leafs, first Muslim to win the Stanley Cup.

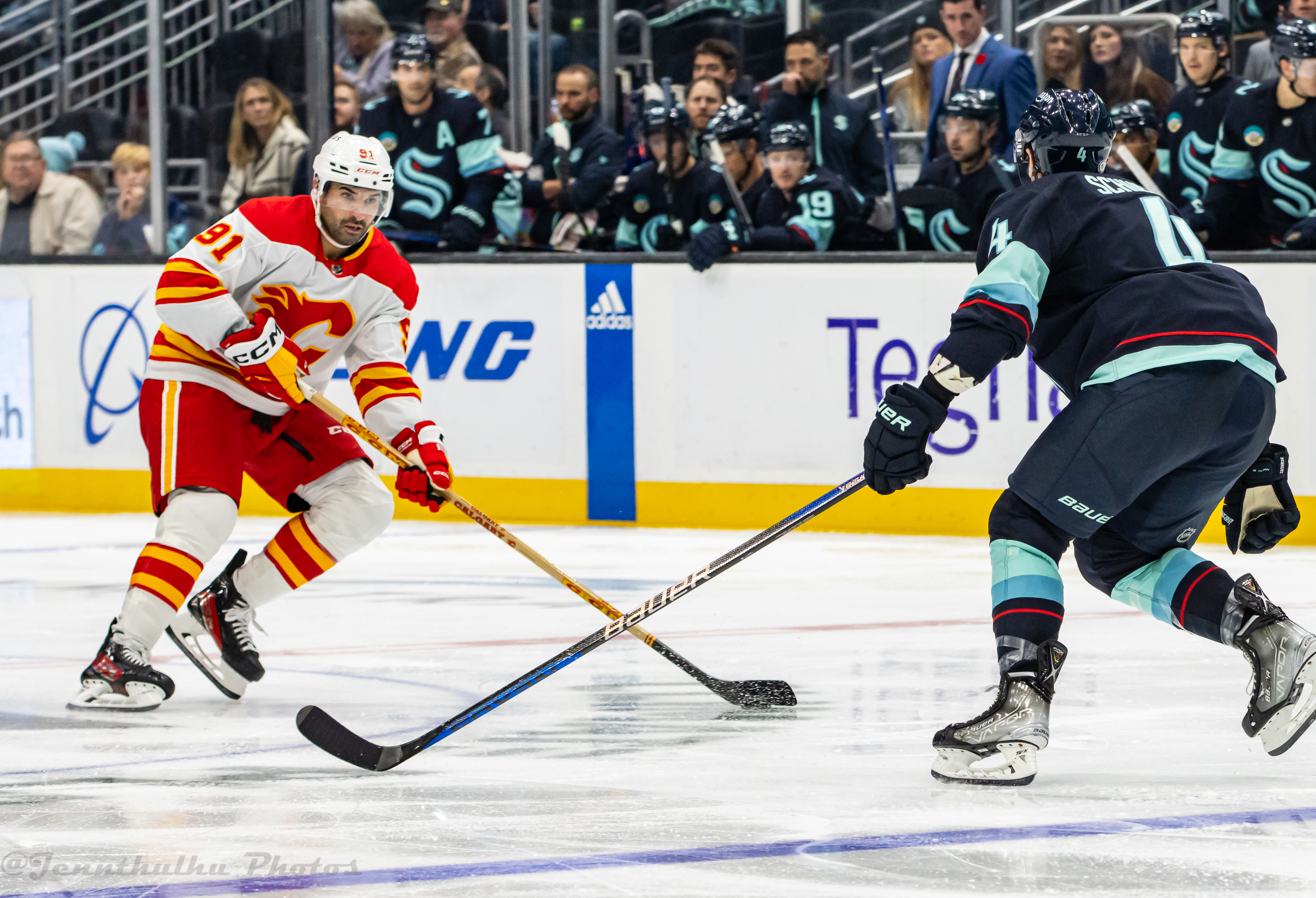
Kadri as a member of the Calgary Flames with Justin Schultz of the Seattle Kraken in 2023.

- Sami Zayn – WWE Wrestler

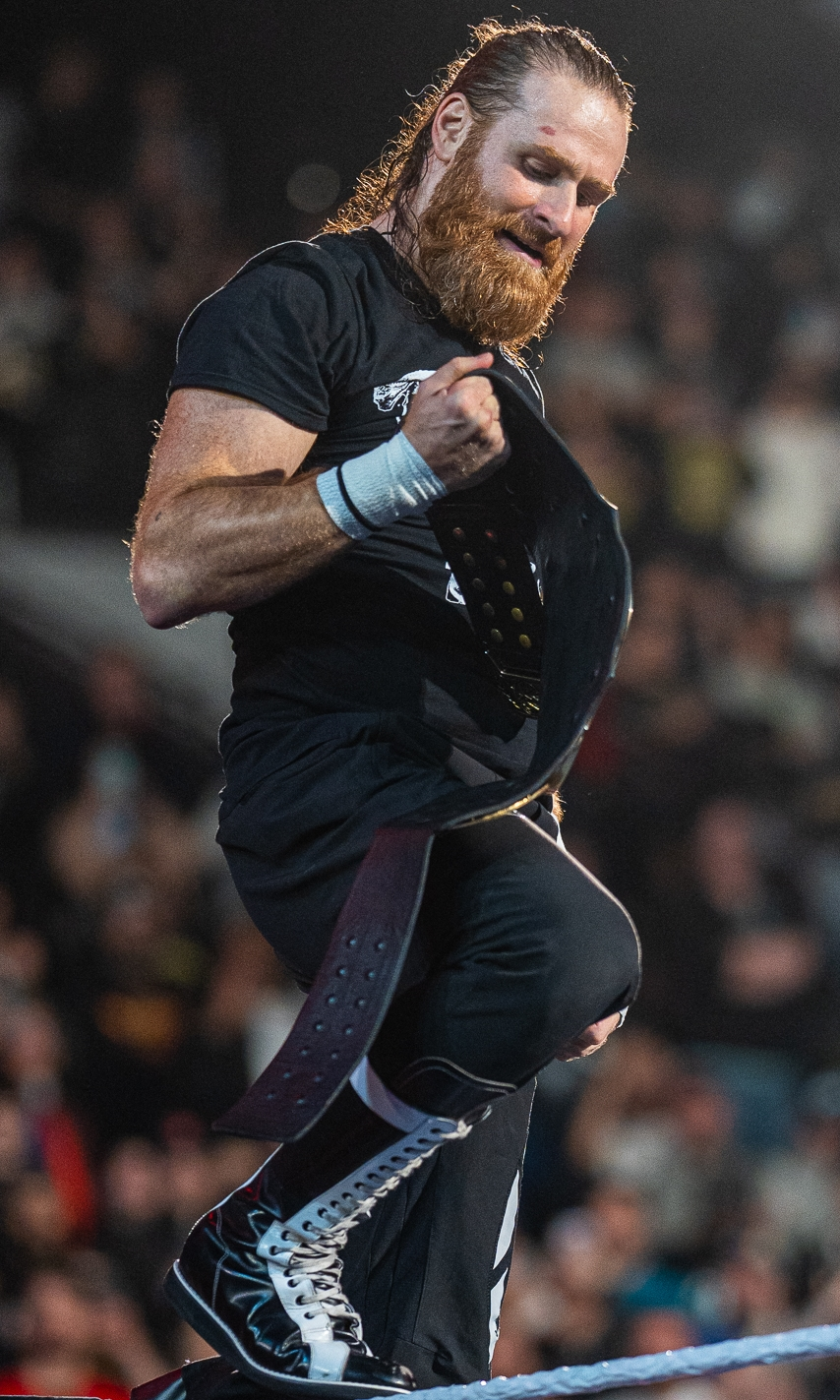
Sami Zayn

- Asmir Begović – Bosnian professional football player, raised in Edmonton, and played for the Canada men's national under-20 soccer team.
- Ali Ahmed (soccer) – soccer player, Whitecaps FC, Canada men's national soccer team
- Mohamed Farsi – soccer player, Columbus Crew, Major League Soccer

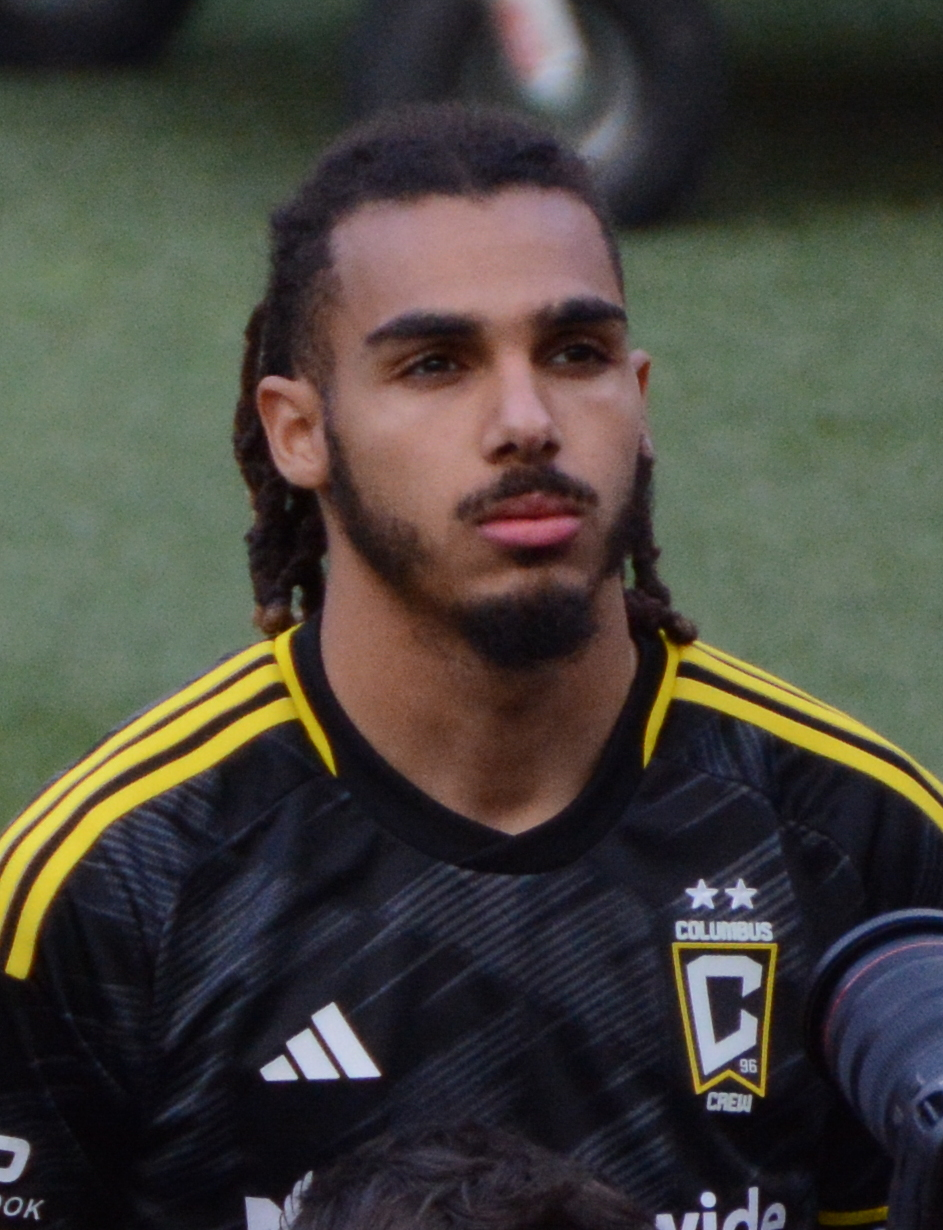
Mohamed Farsi

- Fardaws Aimaq – basketball player
- Aiemann Zahabi – mixed martial artist, bantamweight division of the Ultimate Fighting Championship

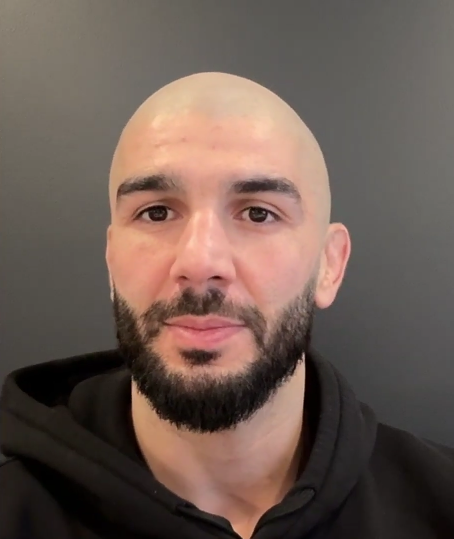
Aiemann Zahabi

- Firas Zahabi – martial artist, owner and head coach at Tristar Gym

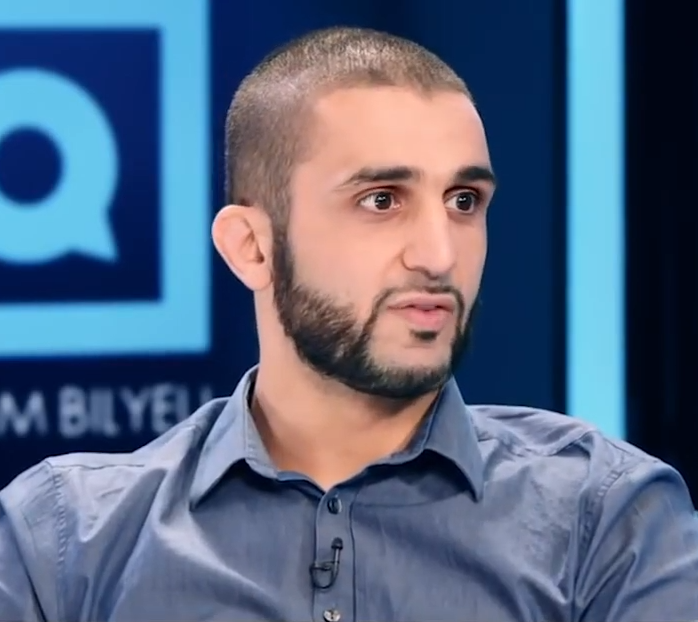
Firas Zahabi

- Yassine Bounou – Canadian-born Moroccan footballer, goalkeeper for Saudi Pro League club Al Hilal and the Morocco national football team

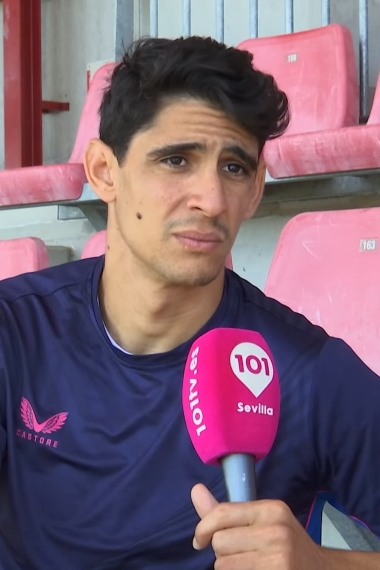
Yassine Bounou

- Ali Mahmoud – Canadian-born Lebanese basketball player, Beirut Club, Lebanese Basketball League
- Mohamed Omar (soccer, born 1999) – soccer player, San Antonio FC, USL Championship

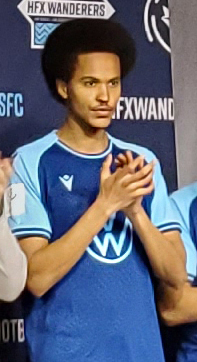
Mohamed Omar (soccer, born 1999)

- Mohammed Ahmed (runner) – Somali-born Canadian long-distance runner, 3-time Olympian, Canada's most successful athlete in long-distance racing, the first to medal in the 5000 metres at both the World Athletics Championships (bronze in 2019 World Athletics Championships) and the Olympic Games (silver in 2021)
- Obby Khan – former Canadian football centre, played for 9 seasons in the Canadian Football League with the Ottawa Renegades, Winnipeg Blue Bombers, and Calgary Stampeders
- Farhan Zaidi – baseball executive, president of baseball operations for the San Francisco Giants of Major League Baseball
- Rana Hamdy – Saudi-born Canadian soccer player, plays for Burlington Soccer Club in League1 Ontario
- Rayyan Pathan – cricketer, born in Toronto, plays for the Canada national cricket team
- Shahid Ahmadzai – Afghan-born Canadian cricketer
- Salman Nazar – Pakistani-born Canadian cricketer
- Kaleem Sana – Pakistani-born Canadian cricketer
- Junaid Siddiqui – Pakistani-born Canadian cricketer
- Saad Bin Zafar – Pakistani-born Canadian cricketer, captain of the Canadian national cricket team
- Mfiondu Kabengele - Canadian professional basketball player for Dubai Basketball of the ABA League and EuroLeague

== See also ==
- Islam in Canada
- List of converts to Islam
- List of Islamic and Muslim related topics
- Lists of Muslims
- Lists of people by belief
