= Islam in Canada =

Canadian Muslims Musulmans Canadiens
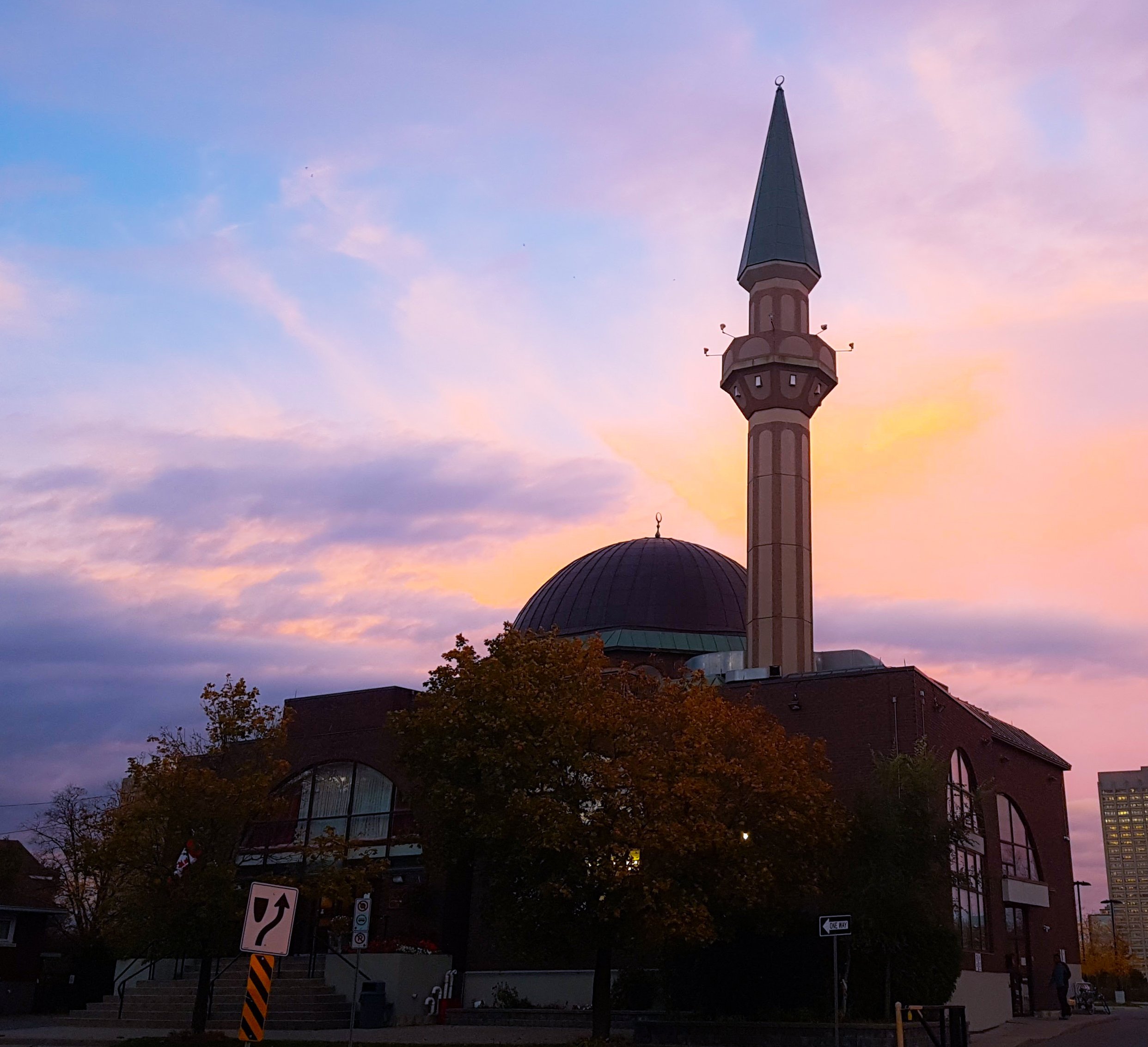
- Grand Mosque in Ottawa

Total population
- 1,775,715; 4.9% of the total Canadian population (2021 census)

Regions with significant populations
- Ontario: 942,990
- Quebec: 421,710
- Alberta: 202,535
- British Columbia: 125,915

Religions
- Islam

Languages
- Canadian English • Canadian French; Arabic• Persian • Turkish Hindustani • Punjabi • Bengali • Gujarati • Sindhi • Somali • Bosnian • Albanian • Other languages of Canada

Islam is the second-largest religion in Canada, practiced by approximately 4.9% of the population. Canadian Muslims are one of the most ethnically diverse religious groups across the country. Muslims have lived in Canada since 1871 and the first mosque was established in 1938. Canada is home to the most northern built mosque in the world called the Midnight Sun Mosque.

There are a number of Islamic organizations and seminaries (madrasas). Opinion polls show most Muslims feel "very proud" to be Canadians, and majority are religious and attend mosque at least once a week. More than half of Canadian Muslims live in Ontario, with significant populations also living in Quebec, Alberta, and British Columbia (BC).

The percentage of Muslims in Canada is 4.9% as of the 2021 census. In the Greater Toronto Area (GTA), 10% of the population is Muslim, and in Greater Montreal, 8.7% of the population is Muslim.

== History ==
=== 1867–1960s ===
Four years after Canada's founding in 1867, the 1871 Canadian Census found 13 European Muslims among the population. The first Muslim organization in Canada was registered by immigrants from greater Syria living in Regina, Saskatchewan in 1934. The first Canadian mosque was constructed in Edmonton in 1938 when there were approximately 700 European Muslims in the country. The building is now part of the museum at Fort Edmonton Park.

The years after World War II saw a small increase in the Muslim population. However, Muslims were still a distinct minority. It was only after the removal of European immigration preferences in the late 1960s and early 1970s that Muslims began to arrive in significant numbers.

=== 1960s–1980s ===
Bosniaks and Albanian Muslims were the founders of Jami Mosque, the first mosque in Toronto in 1968, whose readjustment into a mosque—originally an old Catholic school building—occurred on June 23, 1973. The mosque was readjusted for the Bosniaks, with the support of the local Christians. Later, with the action of University of Toronto (U of T) professor Qadeer Baig, it was purchased by Asian Muslims, while Albanians and Bosniaks later founded the Albanian Muslim Society and Bosanska džamija (Bosnian Mosque) respectively. The oldest mosque in Toronto, with the oldest minaret in Ontario built in Ottoman style is in Etobicoke, part of the Bosnian Islamic Centre.

=== 1980s–2000s ===
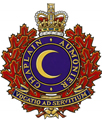
Uniform hat insignia for Canadian military Muslim chaplains.

The first madrasa (Islamic seminary) in North America, al-Rashid Islamic Institute was established in Cornwall, Ontario in 1983 to teach hafiz and ulama and focuses on the traditional Hanafi school of thought. The seminary was established by Mazhar Alam, originally from Bihar, India, under the direction of his teacher the leading Indian Tablighi Jamaat scholar Zakariyya Kandhlawi. Due to its proximity to the U.S. border city of Massena the school has historically had a high percentage of American students. Their most prominent graduate, Muhammad Alshareef completed his hifz in the early 1990s then went on to form the AlMaghrib Institute.

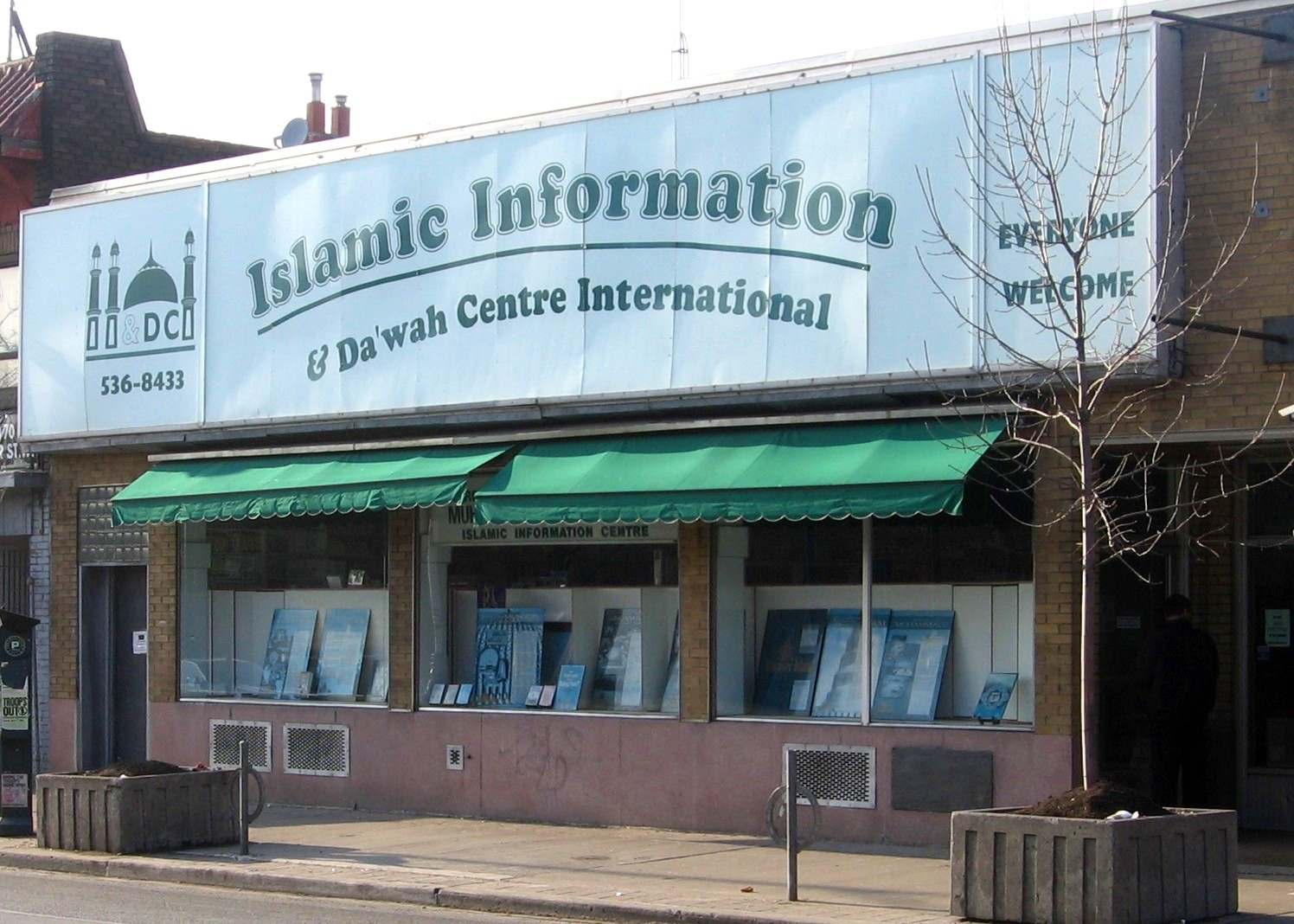
Toronto Dawah Centre, 2007

As with immigrants in general, Muslim immigrants have come to Canada for a variety of reasons. These include higher education, security, employment, and family reunification. Others have come for religious and political freedom, and safety and security, leaving behind civil wars, persecution, and other forms of civil and ethnic strife. In the 1980s, Canada became an important place of refuge for those fleeing the Lebanese civil war. The 1990s saw Somali Muslims arrive in the wake of the Somali civil war as well as Bosniaks fleeing the breakup of Yugoslavia. However Canada has yet to receive any significant numbers of Iraqis fleeing the Iraq war. However, in general almost every Muslim country in the world has sent immigrants to Canada from Pakistan, Bosnia and Herzegovina and Albania to Yemen and Bangladesh.

According to the Canadian Census of 1971 there were 33,000 Muslims in Canada. In the 1970s large-scale non-European immigration to Canada began. This was reflected in the growth of the Muslim community in Canada. In 1981, the Census listed 98,000 Muslims. The 1991 Census indicated 253,265 Muslims.

=== 2000s–present ===
By 2001, the Islamic community in Canada had grown to more than 579,000. In the same year, the fertility rate for Muslims in Canada was higher than the rate for other Canadians (an average of 2.4 children per woman for Muslims in 2001, compared with 1.6 children per woman for other populations in Canada).

Population estimates for the Census 2006 pointed to a figure of 800,000. As of May 2013, Muslims account for 3.2% of the total population, with a total of over a million. In January 2017, six Muslims were killed in a shooting attack at a Quebec city mosque.

In the contemporary era, there are halal restaurants across Canada, including over 1000 in the Greater Toronto Area (GTA).

One of the first Islamic internet radio stations, Canadian Islamic Broadcasting Network, was started in 2019.

== Demographics ==
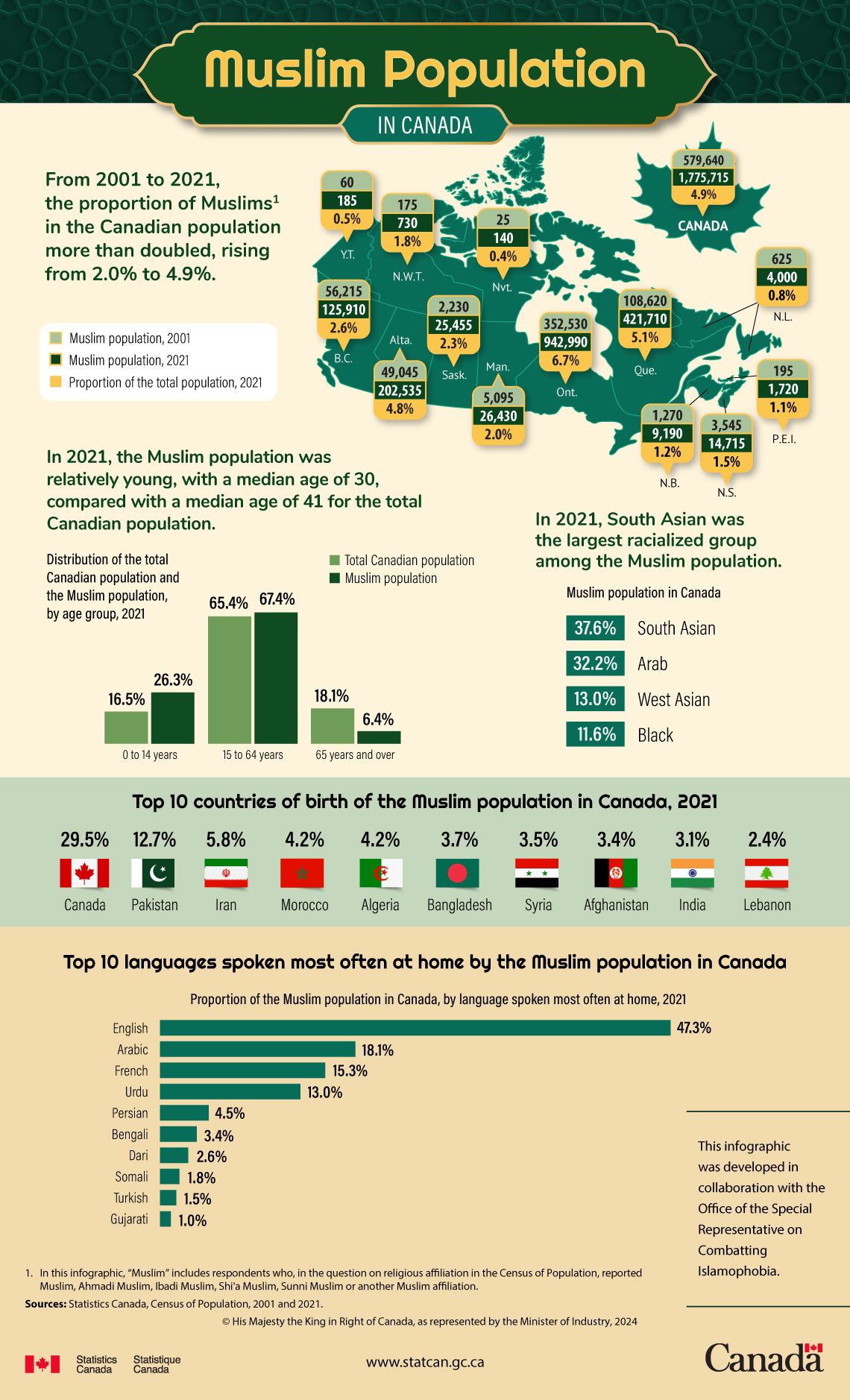
Muslim population of Canada

Historical population
Year	Pop.	±%
1854	3	—
1871	13	+333.3%
1901	47	+261.5%
1911	797	+1595.7%
1921	478	−40.0%
1931	645	+34.9%
1971	33,430	+5082.9%
1981	98,160	+193.6%
1991	253,260	+158.0%
2001	579,645	+128.9%
2011	1,053,945	+81.8%
2021	1,775,715	+68.5%
Source: Statistics Canada

=== National and ethnic origins ===
According to the 2011 National Household Survey, there were 424,925 Muslims living in the Greater Toronto Area (GTA) equaling 7.7% of the total metropolitan population, of which the Muslim community consists of persons of Pakistani, Bangladeshi, Indian, Iranian, African, Arab, Turkish, Bosniak, Albanian, Caucasian, Southeast Asian, and Latin descent. Greater Montreal's Muslim community was 221,040 in 2011 or nearly 6% of the total metropolitan population which includes a highly diverse Muslim population from Western/Southern Europe, Caribbean, North Africa, the Middle East, and the Indian subcontinent. Canada's national capital Ottawa hosts many Lebanese, Turkish, Bosniak, Albanian, South Asian and Somali Muslims, where the Muslim community numbered approximately 65,880 or 5.5% in 2011. In addition to Toronto, Ottawa and Montreal, nearly every major Canadian metropolitan area has a Muslim community, including the Greater Vancouver area (110,645), where many are of Iranian descent, Calgary (58,310), Edmonton (46,125), Windsor (15,575), Winnipeg (11,265), and Halifax (7,540).

In recent years, there has been rapid population growth in Calgary and Edmonton because of economic growth.

Muslim Canadian panethnic groups (1981−2021)
Panethnic group	2021 Canadian census		2011 Canadian census		2001 Canadian census		1991 Canadian census		1981 Canadian census	
Panethnic group	Pop.	%	Pop.	%	Pop.	%	Pop.	%	Pop.	%
Middle Eastern (Note: Statistic includes total responses of "West Asian" and "Arab".)	716,910	40.37%	407,780	38.69%	203,490	35.11%	96,385	38.06%	28,235 (Note: West Asian (Arab): 19,945 persons West Asian (Non-Arab): 5,805 persons North African (Arab): 2,480 persons)	28.76%
South Asian	595,085	33.51%	383,365	36.37%	212,805	36.71%	100,985	39.87%	46,075 (Note: Indo-Pakistani (single): 41,315 persons Indo-Pakistani (multiple): 4,760 persons)	46.94%
European	190,460	10.73%	127,745	12.12%	82,020	14.15%	29,525	11.66%	13,830 (Note: British (single): 6,715 persons Balkan: 1,890 persons British (multiple): 1,580 persons French: 1,235 persons Other European: 2,400 persons)	14.09%
African	183,670	10.34%	90,535	8.59%	51,680	8.92%	19,795	7.82%	3,165	3.22%
Southeast Asian (Note: Statistic includes total responses of "Filipino" and "Southeast Asian".)	11,935	0.67%	11,300	1.07%	5,250	0.91%	2,530	1%	1,370	1.4%
Latin American	2,610	0.15%	1,875	0.18%	890	0.15%	185	0.07%	220	0.22%
East Asian (Note: Statistic includes total responses of "Chinese", "Korean", and "Japanese".)	2,320	0.13%	1,855	0.18%	2,405	0.41%	575	0.23%	370 (Note: Chinese: 360 persons Japanese: 10 persons)	0.38%
Indigenous	1,840	0.1%	1,065	0.1%	345	0.06%	50	0.02%	250 (Note: First Nations: 235 persons Métis: 15 persons)	0.25%
Other/multiracial	70,885	3.99%	28,425	2.7%	20,755	3.58%	3,235	1.28%	4,660	4.75%
Total responses	1,775,715	100%	1,053,945	100%	579,640	100%	253,265	100%	98,165	100%
Total Muslim Canadian Population	1,775,715	100%	1,053,945	100%	579,645	100%	253,265	100%	98,165	100%

=== Branches or denominations ===
Major Canadian cities have local Muslim organizations that deal mainly with issues pertaining to their home city, but that support national associations. Most Muslim organizations on the national level are umbrella groups and coordination bodies. Student-led initiatives are generally well supported and successful, including annual events such as MuslimFest and the Reviving the Islamic Spirit conference, the largest Islamic event in Canada.

==== Sunni Muslims ====
The majority of Canadian Muslims follow Sunni Islam.

==== Ahmadiyya Muslims ====
The Ahmadiyya community has about 50 local chapters scattered across Canada, mainly in southern Ontario. The community have 25 mosques in Canada.

== Geographical distribution ==
=== Provinces and territories ===
Table 1: Muslim Population of Canada in 1991, 2001 and 2011, 2021.

Muslim Canadians by province and territory (1991−2021)
Province/territory	Population (1991)	% (1991)	Population (2001)	% (2001)	Population (2011)	% (2011)	Population (2021)	% (2021)
Ontario	145,560	1.4%	352,530	3.1%	581,950	4.6%	942,990	6.72%
Quebec	44,930	0.6%	108,620	1.5%	243,430	3.1%	421,710	5.07%
Alberta	31,000	1.2%	49,045	1.7%	113,445	3.2%	202,535	4.85%
British Columbia	24,925	0.7%	56,220	1.4%	79,310	1.8%	125,915	2.56%
Manitoba	3,525	0.3%	5,095	0.5%	12,405	1.0%	26,430	2.02%
Saskatchewan	1,185	0.1%	2,230	0.2%	10,040	1.0%	25,455	2.31%
Nova Scotia	1,435	0.1%	3,550	0.4%	8,505	0.9%	14,715	1.54%
New Brunswick	250	0.0%	1,275	0.2%	2,640	0.3%	9,190	1.21%
Newfoundland and Labrador	305	0.0%	630	0.1%	1,200	0.2%	3,995	0.80%
Prince Edward Island	60	0.0%	195	0.1%	660	0.5%	1,720	1.14%
Northwest Territories	55	0.1%	180	0.5%	275	0.7%	730	1.80%
Nunavut	–	–	25	0.1%	50	0.2%	140	0.38%
Yukon	35	0.1%	60	0.1%	40	0.1%	185	0.47%
Canada	253,265	0.9%	579,640	2.0%	1,053,945	3.2%	1,775,715	4.88%

=== Metropolitan Areas ===
Table 2: Muslim Population in Top 20 Metropolitan Areas based on Canada Census 2001, 2011, and 2021.

CMA	Muslim 2001	%	Muslim 2011	%	Muslim 2021	%
Toronto	254,115	5.47%	424,935	7.70%	626,010	10.19%
Montreal	100,185	2.96%	221,040	5.89%	365,675	8.69%
Vancouver	52,590	2.67%	73,215	3.21%	110,645	4.24%
Ottawa	41,725	3.97%	65,880	5.42%	114,780	7.84%
Calgary	25,920	2.75%	58,310	4.86%	100,825	6.88%
Edmonton	19,575	2.11%	46,125	4.05%	86,120	6.16%
Quebec City	3,020	0.45%	6,760	0.91%	19,815	2.43%
Winnipeg	4,805	0.73%	11,265	1.58%	24,565	3.00%
Hamilton	12,880	1.97%	22,520	3.18%	46,435	6.00%
Kitchener	9,180	2.24%	18,940	4.03%	38,655	6.80%
London	11,725	2.74%	16,025	3.43%	35,875	6.70%
Halifax	3,070	0.86%	7,540	1.96%	13,265	2.88%
St. Catharines	3,135	0.84%	4,275	1.11%	10,440	2.45%
Windsor	10,745	3.52%	15,575	4.94%	30,145	7.26%
Oshawa	2,870	0.98%	5,685	1.62%	22,160	5.39%
Victoria	1,230	0.40%	2,485	0.74%	4,975	1.28%
Saskatoon	1,140	0.51%	5,680	2.21%	13,100	4.21%
Regina	770	0.41%	3,545	1.71%	10,460	4.27%
Sherbrooke	1,160	0.77%	2,610	1.33%	6,330	2.88%
Kelowna	405	0.28%	555	0.31%	1,760	0.81%

=== Federal Electoral Districts ===
==== Ontario ====
1. Mississauga—Erin Mills (26.93%) (Liberal Held)
2. Milton (24.28%) (Liberal Held)
3. Don Valley East (23.76%) (Liberal held)
4. Mississauga Centre (22.63%) (Liberal held)
5. Scarborough—Guildwood (20.19%) (Liberal held)
6. Mississauga—Malton (18.87%) (Liberal held)
7. Ottawa South (18.69%) (Liberal held)
8. Scarborough Southwest (18.47%) (Liberal held)
9. Scarborough Centre (18.18%) (Liberal held)
10. Don Valley West (17.84%) (Liberal held)
11. Windsor West (16.79%) (Conservative held)
12. Mississauga-Streetsville (16.50%) (Liberal held)
13. Etobicoke North (15.67%) (Liberal held)

==== Quebec ====
1. Saint-Leonard-Saint-Michel (26.65%) (Liberal held)
2. Saint-Laurent (23.20%) (Liberal held)
3. Ahuntsic-Cartierville (19.04%) (Liberal held)
4. Bourassa (18.13%) (Liberal held)
5. Vimy (16.81%) (Liberal held)
6. Papineau (15.54%) (Liberal held)

==== Alberta ====
1. Calgary Skyview (18.22%) (Conservative held)
2. Calgary Forest Lawn (15.43%) (Conservative held)

Source: Canada 2021 Census Open Data Release

As the Canadian Charter of Rights and Freedoms guarantees freedom of religious expression, Canadian Muslims face no official religious discrimination but have been victims of many hate crimes which have been increasingly going up (see also: Islamophobia in Canada).

Under Section 2(a) of the Charter, the wearing of a hijab is permitted in schools and places of work, although Quebec has ruled that medical faculties are not required to accommodate Muslim women who wish to be served by female employees. Religious holidays and dietary restrictions are also respected, but outside major urban areas it may be difficult to find halal food. It is also often difficult to observe Islamic rules against usury. Some Muslims in some parts of Canada have asked to have family dispute courts to oversee small family cases but were faced with rigorous opposition from both within the Muslim community (both conservative and liberal), and by non-Muslim groups.

In 2011, the Harper government attempted to ban the niqab during citizenship ceremonies. In 2015, the Federal Court of Appeal ruled against the ban, and the Supreme Court turned down the government's appeal.

== Mosques and Islamic centres ==
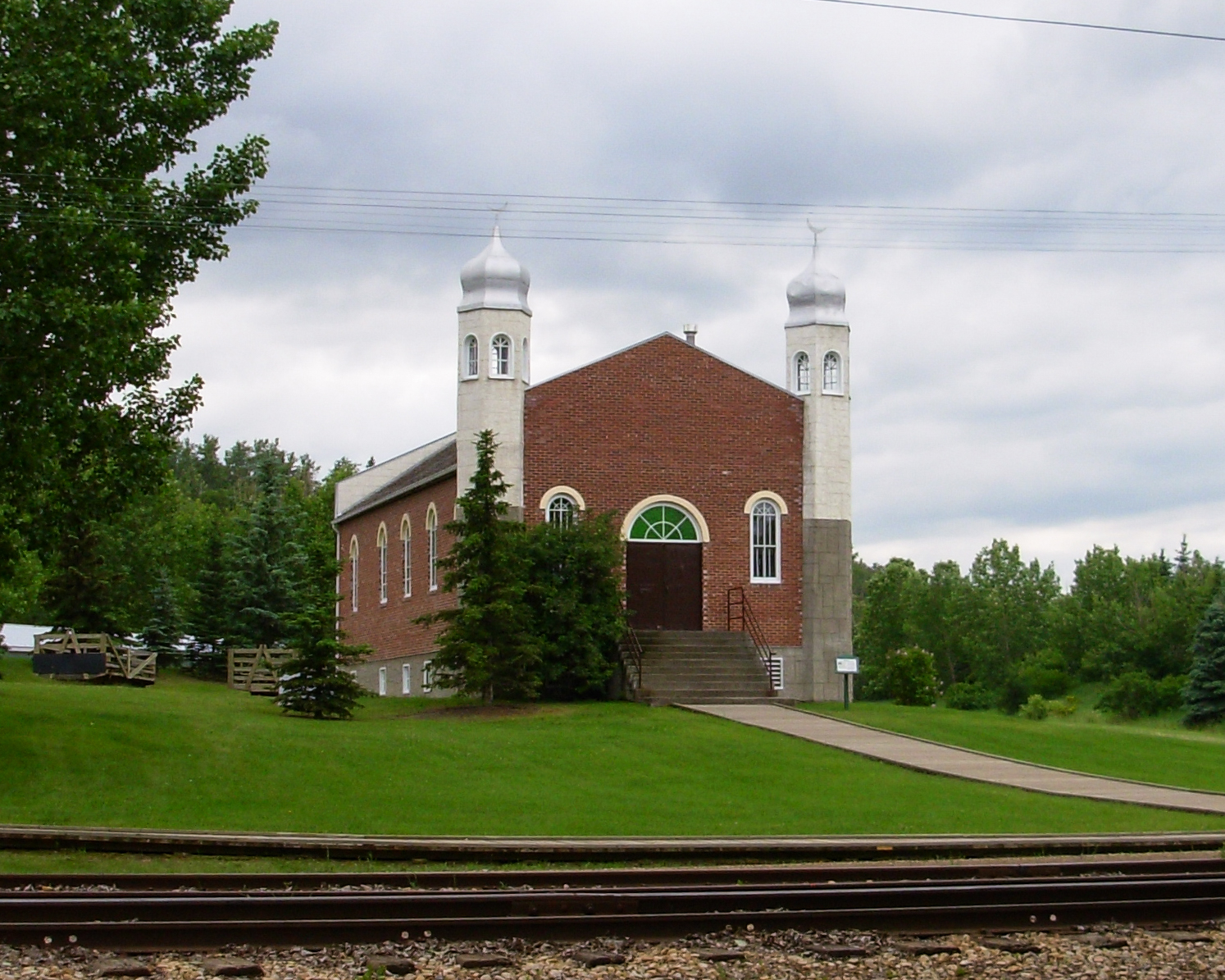
Al-Rashid Mosque in Edmonton, Alberta. First mosque built in Canada in 1938

As of 2024, there are at least 458 mosques and Islamic centres across Canada. Most of the mosques are located either in large metropolitan cities, suburbs, or some small cities.

Midnight Sun Mosque in Inuvik, Northwest Territories					
Midnight Sun Mosque, Inuvik	Ummah Masjid and Community Centre, Halifax	Ottawa Mosque, Ottawa	SNMC Mosque, Ottawa	Islamic Centre of Quebec - El Markaz Islami, Montreal	Gatineau Mosque, Gatineau

== Notable Canadian Muslim figures ==
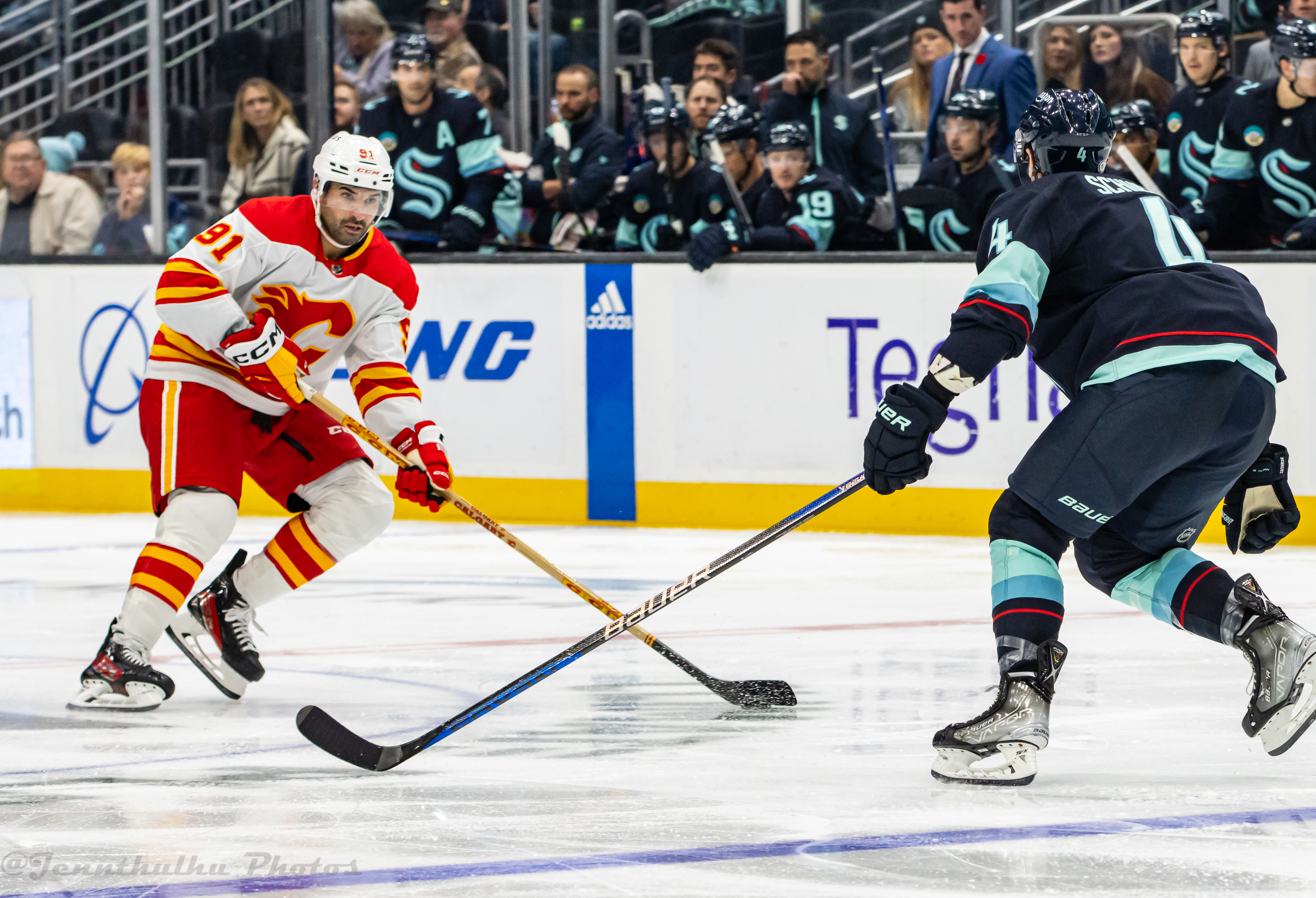
Kadri as a member of the Calgary Flames with Justin Schultz of the Seattle Kraken in 2023.

- Nazem Kadri — Canadian Muslim professional ice hockey player, drafted into the NHL in 2009, first Canadian Muslim to win the Stanley Cup.

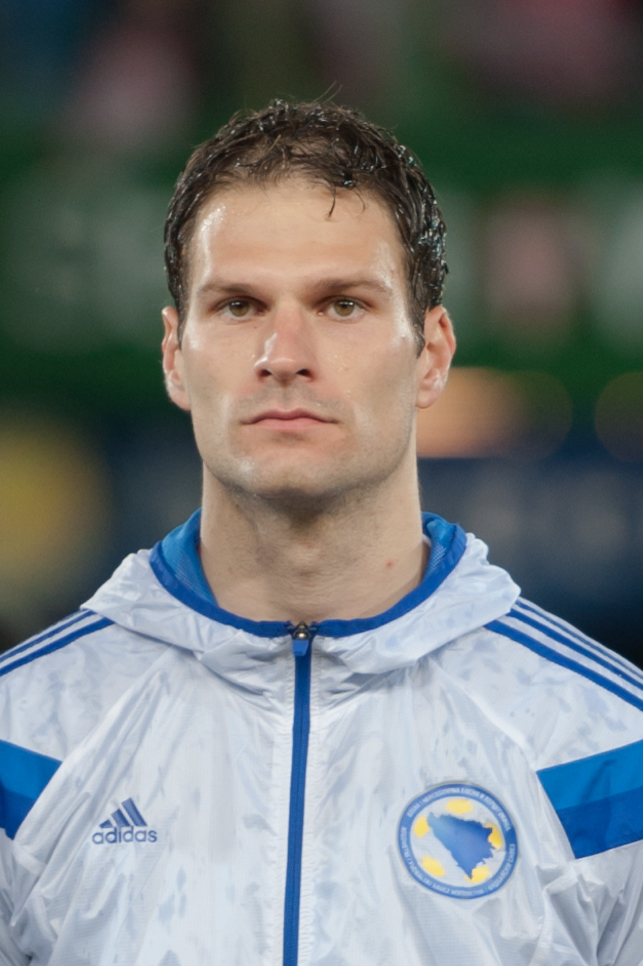
Asmir Begović

- Sami Zayn — WWE wrestler
- Ali Ahmed — soccer player, Whitecaps FC, Canada men's national soccer team
- Asmir Begović — soccer player, goalkeeper for Everton, formerly for Canada men's national under-20 soccer team and the Bosnia and Herzegovina national football team
- Mohamed Farsi — Canadian-born Algerian soccer player, Columbus Crew, Major League Soccer
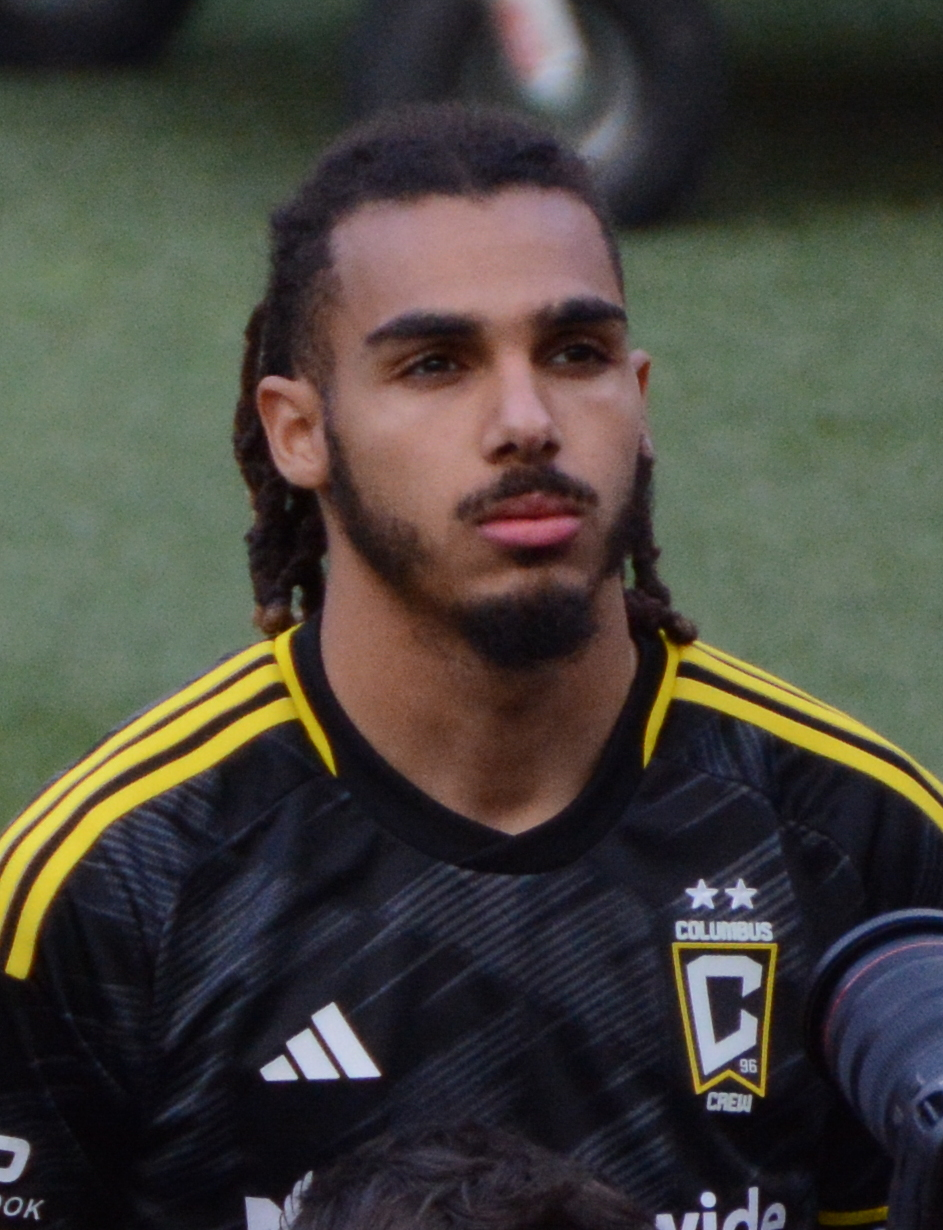
  Mohamed Farsi
- Fardaws Aimaq — Basketball player
- Aiemann Zahabi — Mixed martial artist, bantamweight division of the Ultimate Fighting Championship
- Firas Zahabi — Martial artist, head trainer for Georges St. Pierre, owner and head coach at Tristar Gym
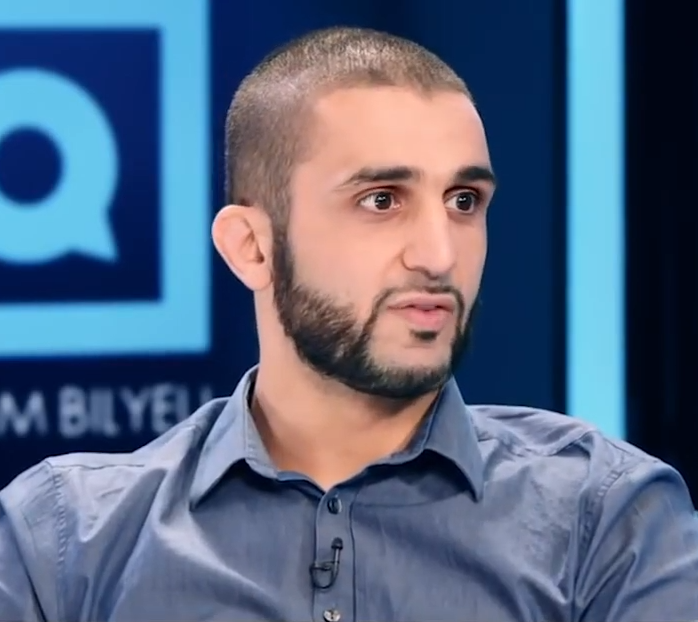
  Firas Zahabi
- Yassine Bounou — Canadian-born Moroccan footballer, goalkeeper for Saudi Pro League club Al Hilal and the Morocco national football team
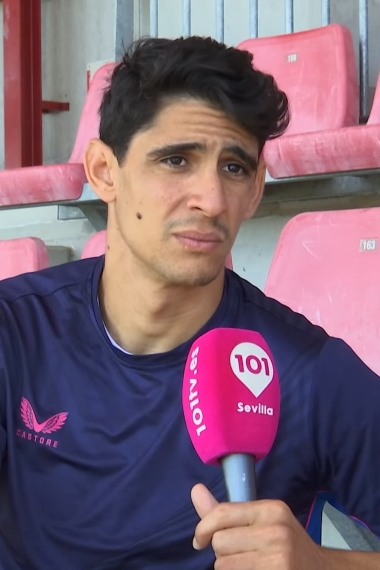
  Yassine Bounou
- Ali Mahmoud — Canadian-born Lebanese basketball player, Beirut Club, Lebanese Basketball League
- Mohamed Omar (soccer, born 1999) - soccer player, San Antonio FC, USL Championship
- Farhan Zaidi — baseball executive, president of baseball operations for the San Francisco Giants of Major League Baseball
- Zarqa Nawaz — Film and television producer, author, public speaker, journalist, and former broadcaster.
- Rayyan Pathan — Cricketer, born in Toronto, plays for the Canada national cricket team
- Obby Khan — Former Canadian football centre, played for 9 seasons in the Canadian Football League with the Ottawa Renegades, Winnipeg Blue Bombers, and Calgary Stampeders, businessman, founder and owner of Shawarma Khan, a Winnipeg-based halal shawarma restaurant
- Alaa Murabit M.D. MSC — Physician, director of global health advocacy and communications at the Bill & Melinda Gates Foundation

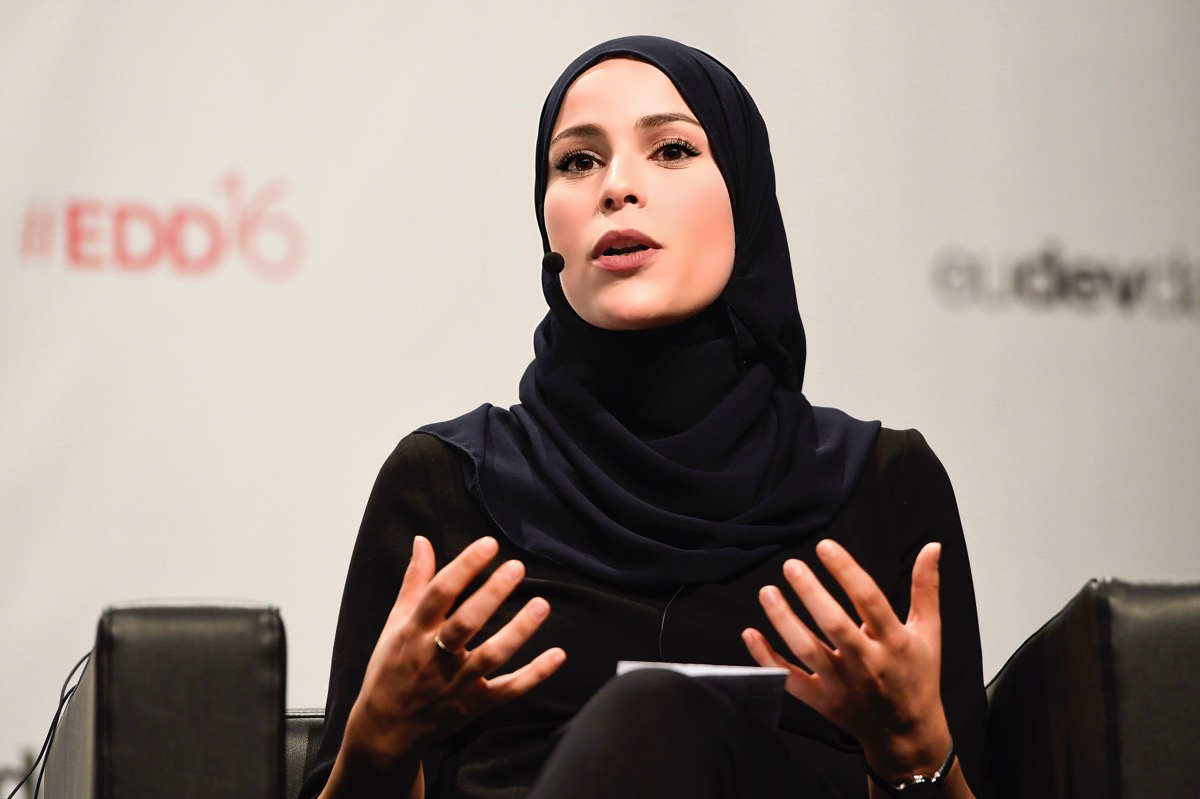
Alaa Murabit

- Omar Sachedina — Anchorman and journalist, CTV
- Haroon Siddiqui — Newspaper journalist, columnist, and a former editor of the Toronto Star
- Farah Nasser — Anchor and journalist, Global News
- Ginella Massa — News Anchor, CBC News
- Hamid Slimi — Imam, founder of the Sayeda Khadija Islamic Center in Mississauga, Ontario
- T. B. Irving — (1914-2002), was a Canadian-American Muslim author, known for producing the first American English translation of the Quran
- Shabir Ally — Guyanese-born Canadian Islamic Scholar, President of the Islamic Information & Dawah Centre International in Toronto
- Mustafa Khattab BA, MA, PhD — Canadian-Egyptian Islamic scholar and author, known for publishing The Clear Qur'an, which is the Canadian English translation of the Quran
- Ingrid Mattson — Canadian Islamic Scholar
- Zijad Delic — Bosnian-Canadian Imam and community leader
- Hilwie Hamdon — (1905-1988), was a Muslim woman in Edmonton, Alberta, who organized support and funding to build the first mosque in Canada, the al-Rashid Mosque
- Ali Hassan — comedian
- Mohammed Ahmed — Somali-born Canadian long-distance runner, 3-time Olympian, Canada's most successful athlete in long-distance racing, the first to medal in the 5000 metres at both the World Athletics Championships (bronze in 2019 World Athletics Championships) and the Olympic Games (silver in 2021)
- Rana Hamdy — Saudi-born Canadian soccer player, plays for Burlington Soccer Club in League1 Ontario
- Shahid Ahmadzai — Afghan-born Canadian cricketer
- Salman Nazar — Pakistani-born Canadian cricketer
- Kaleem Sana — Pakistani-born Canadian cricketer
- Junaid Siddiqui — Pakistani-born Canadian cricketer
- Saad Bin Zafar — Pakistani-born Canadian cricketer, captain of the Canadian national cricket team
- Jamal Badawi — Egyptian-Canadian author, preacher and speaker on Islam
- Hasan Amat — Singaporean-Canadian WWI soldier, served as a private in the Royal Canadian Regiment, the 4th Overseas Pioneer Battalion, and the 1st Canadian Infantry Battalion, fought and died at the Battle of Hill 70.
- Lt. Commander Wafa Dabbagh — Palestinian-Egyptian-Canadian military officer of the Canadian Armed Forces (CAF) who received the Queen Elizabeth II Diamond Jubilee Medal
- Shireen Ahmed — Writer, public speaker, sports activist

== Canadian Muslim social organizations ==
There are several organizations working to support the Canadian Muslim community by representing their causes and voices, and channeling the efforts of Muslims for the greater good of Canadians as well as people struggling in other parts of the world. Some are listed below:

=== Muslim Association of Canada ===
Muslim Association of Canada (MAC) is a charitable organization and a grassroots movement to establish an Islamic presence in Canada that is balanced, constructive, and integrated in the social fabric and culture of Canada.

=== National Council of Canadian Muslims ===
National Council of Canadian Muslims (NCCM) is an independent, non-partisan and non-profit organization that protects Canadian human rights and civil liberties, challenges discrimination and Islamophobia.

=== Islamic Relief ===
Islamic Relief Canada helps Canadian Muslims channel charitable contributions to not only Canadians but people in need across the globe. Their platform helps strengthen the relationship between donors and beneficiaries by providing a high level of transparency.

=== Canadian Council of Muslim Women ===
Canadian Council of Muslim Women (CCMW) is an organization dedicated to the empowerment, equality and equity of all Muslim women in Canada. It has chapters all over Canada and has launched several projects through community engagement, public policy, stakeholder engagement and amplified awareness of the social injustices that Muslim women and girls endure in Canada.

=== Muslim Welfare Canada ===
Muslim Welfare Canada works to fight hunger through its food banks and meals on wheels programs for senior citizens. They also run homes/shelters for women and children as well as refugees.

=== Canadian Islamic Broadcasting Network ===
Canadian Islamic Broadcasting Network is an online radio station that was set up in 2019 with the intention of broadcasting Islamic information across Canada via internet radio. The main focus of the station is to provide Islamic Talk programming.

=== Muslim Federal Employee Network ===
Muslim Federal Employee Network is national level network for Muslims in the Federal Public Service. It plays a key leadership role in supporting the Government of Canada to become a model of inclusion of Muslim public servants. The Muslim Federal Employees Network provides an open and safe forum for Muslim and non-Muslim employees to connect and discuss issues related to the promotion of a healthy and inclusive work environment for Muslim employees in the federal public service.

== Identity and beliefs ==
=== Opinion held by Muslims ===
In a 2016 Environics poll, 83% of Muslims were "very proud" to be Canadian, compared with 73% of non-Muslim Canadians who said the same thing. Canadian Muslims reported "Canada's freedom and democracy" as the greatest source of pride, and "multiculturalism and diversity" as the second greatest. 94% of Canadian Muslims reported a "strong" or "very strong" sense of belonging to Canada. 78% of Canadian Muslims attend mosque at least once a week. 73% of women wear some sort of head-covering in public (58% wear the hijab, 13% wear the chador and 2% wear the niqab).

Both pride in being Canadian and having a strong sense of belonging had increased in Canadian Muslims as compared to a 2006 survey. Mosque attendance and wearing a head covering in public had also increased since the 2006 survey.

=== Opinion on Muslims ===
According to the surveys conducted by the Angus Reid Institute (ARI), 24% of the Canadians had a favorable opinion of Islam in 2013 which increased to 34% in the 2016 survey and in Quebec, it increased from 16% in 2013 to 32% in 2016.

A majority (75%) of the Canadians strongly support allowing Muslim women to wear hijab in public. However, the wearing of full face and body covering niqab and burqa is strongly opposed. Only three-in-ten Canadians are supportive of it.

=== Politics ===
Polling of Canadian Muslims in 2024 by Angus Reid Institute
Conservative Party	15%
Liberal Party	31%
NDP	41%
Green Party	6%
Other party/Independent	7%

The Liberal Party (45%) voters and New Democratic Party (42%) voters have more favourable opinion on Muslims, than compared to Conservative Party voters (24%).

In 2023, the Canadian Muslim donor group known as the Network-100 GTA consisting of 400 working professionals pulled financial support from the Liberal Party, who had received over $20,000 prior since 2014, due to residing Prime Minister Justin Trudeau’s refusal to call for a ceasefire in the Gaza war. The National Council of Canadian Muslims made a statement during the holiday Ramadan in 2024 with the mention of MPs not being welcome in their places of worship until a ceasefire was enacted.

A May 2024 poll showed 41% of Muslims intended to vote for the NDP, 31% for Liberals and 15% for the Conservatives.

Canadian Muslim vote by general election
Election year	Conservative	Liberal	Green	NDP	BQC	PPC	Other
2006	15%	49%	1%	28%	5%	—	1%
2008	15.6%	49.2%	—	35.2%	—	—	—
2011	12%	46%	—	38%	—	—	4%
2015	2%	65%	1%	10%	—	—	22%
2019	10%	81.1%	0.8%	8.1%	—	—	—
2021	5%	71.1%	0.3%	21.5%	—	1.6%	0.5%
2025	15%	65%	—	10%	—	—	10%

== Media ==
- Little Mosque on the Prairie was a Canadian sitcom on CBC Television created by Zarqa Nawaz.
- Ginella Massa is the first Canadian hijabi news anchor for CityNews Toronto.

== See also ==
=== General links ===
- Canadian Muslims
- Islamophobia in Canada
- List of Canadian Muslims
- Religion in Canada
- History of Islam in the Arctic
- List of mosques in Canada
- Glossary of Islam
- Outline of Islam
- Index of Islam-related articles

=== Groups and councils ===
- Canadian Islamic Congress
- Council on American-Islamic Relations
- National Council of Canadian Muslims
- Muslim Canadian Congress
- Muslim Association of Canada
