= Dabbagh =

Dabbagh, al-Dabbagh or Aldabbagh is an Arabic surname that may refer to the following notable people:

- Bahram Dabbagh (born 1992), Iranian football midfielder
- Khalil Dabbagh (اللواء خليل جاسم الدباغ 1916), Iraqi military officer
- Oday Dabbagh (born 1998), Palestinian football forward
- Selma Dabbagh (born 1970), a British-Palestinian writer
- Wafa Dabbagh (died 2012), Canadian military officer
- Ali Aldabbagh (born 1955), Iraqi engineer, businessman and politician
- Amr Al-Dabbagh (born 1966), Saudi businessman
- Abd al-Aziz al-Dabbagh (died 1719), Moroccan Islamic scholar and mystic
- Muhammad ibn Abd al-Aziz al-Dabbagh (1928–2008), Moroccan jurisprudent and writer
- Salim al-Dabbagh (born 1941), Iraqi painter
- Yasmeen Al-Dabbagh (born 1997), Saudi Arabian sprinter
