= Burlington SC =

Burlington SC may refer to:

- Burlington SC (Ontario Premier League), a Canadian semi-professional soccer team
- Burlington SC (Canadian Soccer League), a former Canadian semi-professional soccer team currently known as Halton United
