= Daniel Jodah =

Canadian-Guyanese soccer player

Personal information
- Full name: Daniel Austen Jodah
- Date of birth: March 27, 1995 (age 31)
- Place of birth: Mississauga, Ontario, Canada
- Height: 5 ft 9 in (1.75 m)
- Position: Midfielder

Youth career
- Erin Mills SC
- Woodbridge Strikers
- 2011–2015: Toronto FC

College career
Years	Team	Apps	(Gls)
2013–2016	Marshall Thundering Herd	71	(11)

Senior career*
Years	Team	Apps	(Gls)
2014–2015	Toronto FC III	10+	(0+)
2017–2018	Sigma FC	24	(6)
2021	Scrosoppi FC	9	(0)
2022–2023	Sigma FC	4	(0)
2024	Burlington SC	11	(0)
2024	→ Burlington SC B	5	(0)

International career^{‡}
2017	Guyana	1	(0)
- * Club domestic league appearances and goals as of September 4, 2024 ‡ National team caps and goals as of December 31, 2021

Daniel Austen Jodah (born March 27, 1995) is a soccer player. Born in Canada, he represented Guyana internationally.

== Early life ==
Jodah began playing youth soccer with Erin Mills SC and later played with Woodbridge Strikers.

He played for the Ontario provincial program from U14 to U16. In 2011, he played in an exhibition match against the TFC U17 team, and afterwards was invited to trial and later joined the Toronto FC Academy.

== College career ==
In 2013, he began playing for the Marshall University Thundering Herd. In his sophomore season, he was named to the All-Conference USA Second Team.

== Club career ==
In 2014, he played for Toronto FC III in League1 Ontario and in 2015, he played for them in the Premier Development League. He was named one of the Top 15 prospects to watch from the 2015 PDL season.

In 2017, he played for Sigma FC in League1 Ontario, scoring 4 goals in 15 games. In 2018, he scored 2 goals in 9 league appearances, and also played in 3 playoff games.

In 2018, he participated in the Open Trials for the new Canadian Premier League, being one of the 56 players of the over 200 participants who were invited to the second trial.

In 2021, he played for Scrosoppi FC, making nine appearances.

In 2022 and 2023, he played with his former club Sigma FC.

== International career ==
In October 2010, he participated in a camp with the Canadian U15 team.

In November 2017, he was called up to the Guyana national team ahead of friendlies against Trinidad and Tobago and Indonesia. He made his debut on November 25 against Indonesia.
