= Obrad Bejatovic =

Canadian soccer player (born 2003)

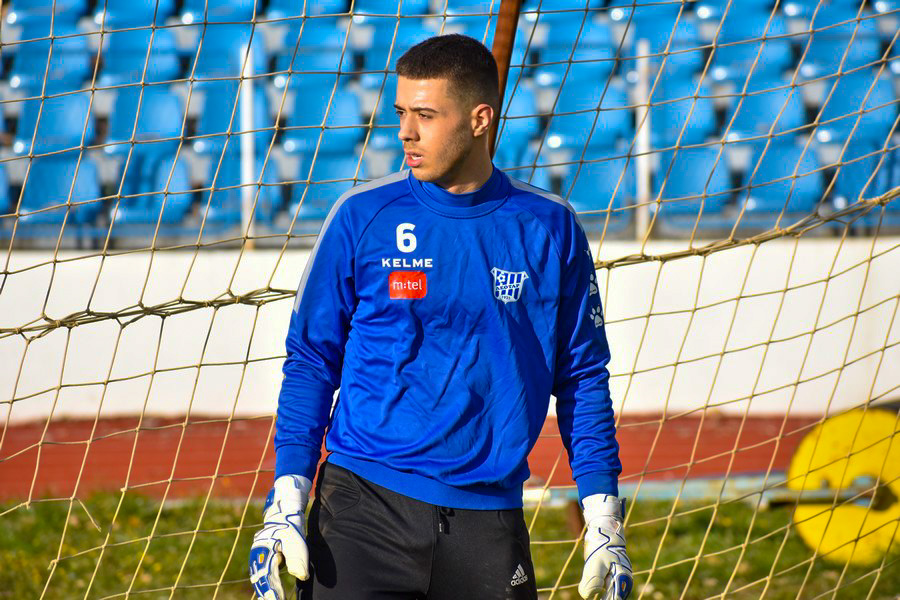
- Bejatovic with Leotar in 2023

Personal information
- Date of birth: August 21, 2003 (age 23)
- Place of birth: Mississauga, Ontario, Canada
- Height: 1.94 m (6 ft 4 1/2 in)
- Position: Goalkeeper

Team information
- Current team: Velež Nevesinje

Youth career
- Burlington Force Academy
- Hamilton United

College career
Years	Team	Apps	(Gls)
2021	Ryerson Rams	0	(0)
2023–	TMU Bold (Note: Ryerson University changed its name to Toronto Metropolitan University in 2022)	7	(0)

Senior career*
Years	Team	Apps	(Gls)
2021	Serbian White Eagles		
2022	Hamilton United	1	(0)
2022	Hercegovac	3	(0)
2023	Leotar Trebinje	0	(0)
2023	Hamilton City	5	(0)
2024	Burlington SC	2	(0)
2024	→ Burlington SC B	5	(0)
2024	Serbian White Eagles	5	(0)
2024–2025	Drina Višegrad	17	(0)
2025	Velež Nevesinje		
- * Club domestic league appearances and goals as of October 7, 2025

Obrad Bejatovic (Serbian Cyrillic: Обрад Бејатовић; born August 21, 2003) is a Canadian soccer player who plays as a goalkeeper for First League of Republika Srpska side Velež Nevesinje.

== Early life ==
Bejatovic played youth soccer in Canada with the Burlington Force Soccer Academy and Hamilton United.

== University career ==
In 2021, he began attending Ryerson University, where he played for the men's soccer team, but did not make any appearances. He returned to the school in 2023 (since renamed Toronto Metropolitan University) and played for the men's team.

== Club career ==
In 2021, Bejatovic played with the Serbian White Eagles in the Canadian Soccer League.

In 2022, he played for Hamilton United in League1 Ontario.

In 2022, he signed with Bosnian club Hercegovac in the Second League of the Republika Srpska. He made his debut on September 11, 2022, against FK Rudar Ugljevik.

In January 2023, he signed with Premier League of Bosnia and Herzegovina club Leotar, after training with the club the previous season. After his time in Bosnia, he returned to the CSL circuit to play with Hamilton City.

In 2024, he returned to his former team, the Serbian White Eagles, for the 2024 season. In his second stint with the Serbs, he helped the club win the Royal CSL Cup by defeating Scarborough SC.

In July 2024, he signed with Bosnian side Drina Višegrad of the First League of Republika Srpska. He left Drina during the winter transfer market to sign with Velež Nevesinje. However, he suffered a leg injury in a training session that required surgery.

== Honours ==
Serbian White Eagles

- Canadian Soccer League Royal CSL Cup: 2024
