= Brenda Elsey =

American historian

- Occupation: Historian

Academic background
- Education: Michigan State University (BA; 1997); Stony Brook University (MA; 2001) (PhD; 2007)

Academic work
- Discipline: Historian of Latin America
- Sub-discipline: History of sports and gender in Latin America
- Institutions: Hofstra University
- Website: https://twitter.com/politicultura

Brenda Elsey is an American historian of Latin America, politics, soccer and gender. Since 2008, she has been the co-director of the Latin American and Caribbean Studies program at Hofstra University.

== Education ==
Elsey earned a bachelor of arts in history and religious studies from Michigan State University in 1997. In 2002, she earned her masters of arts in history from Stony Brook University, and her doctorate in history from the same institution in 2007. She has stated that she attended Stony Brook due to its Latin American studies department.

== Career ==
Elsey is a professor of history at Hofstra University. She is a co-director of the university's Latin American and Caribbean Studies program, is a chairperson of the advisory board for Hofstra's Center for Civic Engagement, and directed the university's women's studies department from 2009 until 2013.

She was a recipient of the 2012 Stessin Prize for her first book, Citizens and Sportsmen: Fútbol and Politics in Twentieth Century Chile. University of North Carolina at Chapel Hill's Jeffery Richey, writing for the Hispanic American Historical Review, lauded Citizens and Sportsmen as the "first English-language academic monograph dealing with the history of soccer in Latin America." Conversely, while praising the book, George Mason University's Matthew B. Karush in Social History criticized Elsey for not fully exploring Chilean soccer clubs' political radicalization.

In 2019, Elsey joined the Fare network as development lead for American soccer governing bodies. In 2022, prior the FIFA World Cup in Qatar, she was a speaker for Northwestern University in Qatar's panel on the topic. She discussed Qatar's history of "gender-washing" to secure their bid for the World Cup, predicted that Qatar would not feature women's soccer teams, and outlined a history of discriminatory practices that she believed could re-emerge. Elsey was a monitor for discrimination during the 2022 World Cup.

She has written on sports and social justice for publications such as The New Republic, The New York Times, and Sports Illustrated. She has been interviewed by South American news stations such as The Clinic, El Comercio, and Radio Cooperativa on the politics of soccer clubs in South America and the gender roles of players such as Lionel Messi.

She co-hosts the podcast Burn It All Down alongside Shireen Ahmed, Amira Rose Davis, Lindsay Gibbs, and Jessica Luther. According to OZY's Michelle Bruton, it was the first feminist sports podcast to analyze sports culture from an intersectional feminist lens.

== Works ==
=== Books ===
- Citizens and Sportsmen: Fútbol and Politics in Twentieth-Century Chile. University of Texas; 2011. ISBN 9780292744714, 0292744714
- Football and the Boundaries of History: Critical Studies in Soccer. Edited by Stanislao G. Pugliese. Palgrave Macmillan, 2017. ISBN 9781349950058, 134995005X
- Futbolera: A History of Women and Sports in Latin America. Co-produced with Joshua Nadel; 2020. ISBN 9781477322345, 1477322345

=== Articles ===
- "Sport in Latin America." Edited by Robert Edelman and Wayne Wilson. In The Oxford Handbook of Sports History, 2017. doi:10.1093/oxfordhb/9780199858910.013.27.
- "Football at the 'End' of the World: the 1962 World Cup in Chile." Edited by Stefan Rinke and Kay Schiller. In The FIFA World Cup 1930 – 2010 Politics, Commerce, Spectacle and Identities, 2014. doi:10.5771/9783835326064-162.
