= Romedi Llapi =

Albanian footballer (born 2002)

Personal information
- Date of birth: 31 January 2002 (age 24)
- Place of birth: Detroit, Michigan, United States
- Height: 1.87 m (6 ft 2 in)
- Position: Midfielder

Team information
- Current team: Labëria
- Number: 26

Youth career
- East York SC
- Wexford SC/GSSA
- –2017: Toronto FC
- 2018–2020: Flamurtari
- 2021: Alzira

Senior career*
Years	Team	Apps	(Gls)
2020–2021	Flamurtari	2	(0)
2021	ProStars FC	1	(1)
2022	Burlington SC	16	(1)
2023–	Labëria	12	(0)

International career^{‡}
2018	Albania U17	3	(0)
- * Club domestic league appearances and goals as of 4 May 2023 ‡ National team caps and goals as of 24 April 2018

Romedi Llapi (born 31 January 2002) is a footballer who plays as a midfielder for Kategoria e Dytë club Labëria. Born in the United States and raised in Canada, he represented Albania at youth international level.

== Early life ==
Born in Detroit, United States of America, Llapi grew up in Toronto, starting with local youth side East York SC at the age of five. Afterwards, he joined Wexford SC's Global Satellite Soccer Academy, at age nine. In 2015, Llapi went on a six-week trial with English club Manchester City after previously attending trials with Bury, Bolton Wanderers and Tottenham Hotspur. In 2017, Llapi was called into a talent identification camp for the Canada U15 team. In 2021, he joined the youth system of Spanish club UD Alzira.

== Club career ==
After progressing through Flamurtari's youth system, Llapi made his Albanian Superliga debut on 21 January 2020, coming on as a 69th-minute substitute for Arinaldo Rrapaj in a 2–0 away defeat to Vllaznia.

In 2021, he played one game for ProStars FC in League1 Ontario.

In 2022, he joined Burlington SC.

== International career ==
Llapi is also eligible to play for the United States and Canada. In 2015, he attended a national team camp for the Canada U15 team.

In 2018, Llapi appeared for Albania U17 at the San Marino Cup.
