= Hilwie Hamdon =

Hilwie Jomha Hamdon (1905 - 1988) was a Muslim woman from Edmonton, Alberta, who organized support and funding to build the first mosque in Canada, the Al-Rashid Mosque. She was born in current day Lebanon in 1905. Not much is known about her early life. She married Ali Hamdon who had immigrated to Canada 1901, and together they settled in Fort Chipewyan, Alberta, where Ali Hamdon had established a successful fur trading business. After their children were born, they moved to Edmonton, which was a much larger city with well-established schools. Hilwie Hamdon had six children: Evelyn, Lavida, Moneer, Sidney, Helen and Lewis.

By 1931, there were nearly 700 Muslims living in Canada, many coming from the region of Syria and Lebanon, which was going through upheaval after the fall of the Ottoman Empire. At that time, there was only one mosque in all of North America, established in 1929 in Ross, North Dakota. In the early 30s, the Muslim community in Edmonton began to discuss building a mosque. Hamdon approached the mayor to request that the city provide land for the proposed mosque, and assured him that the Muslim community would be able to find the funds to complete the project. She then led the effort to raise the funds, working with a group of women to solicit donations from the Muslim community in Edmonton, Alberta and Saskatchewan. They also raised funds and gathered support from people of other faiths, and from the business community in downtown Edmonton. They raised the $5,000 needed to build the mosque, and in 1938, the Al-Rashid mosque, the first to be built in Canada, was opened.

Hamdon died in Edmonton in 1988.

In 2016, Edmonton city officials announced that they would name a new grade school (K-9) in her honor. The new Hilwie Hamdon school opened in 2017.
