= Muslim Association of Canada =

Islamic organization based in Canada

- Founded: 1997; 29 years ago
- Type: Non-profit organization; association
- Legal status: Active
- Purpose: Provides religious and educational services for the Muslim community in Canada.
- Headquarters: Mississauga, Ontario
- Location: 13 Canadian cities.
- Region served: Canada
- Official language: English; French
- Board Chair: Mourad Mhiri
- Website: www.macnet.ca

The Muslim Association of Canada is a non-profit organization which provides religious and educational services for the Muslim community in Canada.

MAC operates in 13 Canadian cities, with a vision to establish an Islamic presence in Canada that is integrated within the social fabric and culture of Canada. MAC works to achieve its mission by building Muslim individuals through educational, who are spiritually connected, strongly grounded in their own faith, with an understanding of what Islam means in the modern world.

== Calgary ==
The Muslim Association of Canada (MAC) in Calgary, Alberta operates the Al Salam Centre in northwest Calgary and the MAC Islamic School Calgary in the northeast. The Al Salam Centre features a mosque, a gymnasium, and a youth room, serving as a community hub. The MAC Islamic School offers education from kindergarten to grade 9. MAC Calgary also boasts a robust youth department, providing various programs and activities to support the development and engagement of young Muslims in the community. Additionally, they operate the MAC United Soccer Club, catering to both youth and adults, promoting physical activity and community involvement through sports.

== Edmonton ==
Edmonton, Alberta's main MAC resource is the MAC Islamic Center or Rahma Mosque, located in westside Edmonton. The center features a mosque, Creative Minds preschool, a weekend Islamic school, and two youth rooms. In May 2012, led by the MAC Islamic Center, MAC held a three-day convention that also included a concert given by Dawud Wharnsby.

They also run a private school in northwest Edmonton, the MAC Islamic School, which covers pre-school to grade 9, and another Creative Minds preschool in north Edmonton.

== Toronto ==
Located in Toronto, Ontario, MAC Toronto is a branch of MAC, providing religious and educational services for Muslims in the Greater Toronto Area (GTA).

MAC Toronto offer programs for communities in Toronto such as leadership training, Campus Halaqas (Religious circles), Islam awareness week Training and MYVoice - a quarterly magazine aimed at engaging Muslim youth.

== MAC Toronto centers and mosques in Toronto ==
- Masjid Toronto at Dundas
- Masjid Toronto at Adelaide
- MAC Education Centre
- Kitchener Masjid
- Islamic Community Centre of Ontario

== MAC Toronto schools in the GTA (Greater Toronto Area) ==
- Al-Huda Islamic Schools – Ajax Campus
- Al-Huda Islamic Schools – Milton Campus
- Al-Huda Islamic Schools - Applewood
- Al-Huda Islamic Schools – OGS Campus
- Olive Grove Islamic School
- MAC Maple Grove School
- MAC Islamic Preschool and Childcare

== MAC Montreal ==
Located in Montreal, Quebec, MAC Montreal is the largest MAC chapter.

== MAC centers and mosques in Montreal ==
- Al-Rawdah Masjid
- Centre Communautaire Laurentien (CCL)
- Centre Islamique de Verdun (CIV)

== Controversies ==
A 2014 QMI article claimed that between 2005 and 2009, the Muslim Association of Canada donated a total sum of $296,514 to IRFAN-Canada, a Canadian registered charity at the time. IRFAN-Canada's status was revoked in 2011 by the Canada Revenue Agency (CRA) after allegedly transferring over 14.6 million dollars to groups that have ties with Hamas. IRFAN-Canada was listed as a terrorist group by the Canadian Government on April 29, 2014.

The Muslim Association of Canada released a statement indicating that opposed to terrorist activity of any kind and that it had not donated to IRFAN-Canada since 2009.

In a testimony before The Standing Senate Committee on Human Rights on November 21, 2022, Mr. Nabil Sultan, Director of Communications and Community Engagement and former Chairman of the Muslim Association of Canada stated that "in 2020, the Muslim Association of Canada, MAC, contacted the RCMP Commissioner, Brenda Lucki, to seek an explanation for the Toronto Sun articles. MAC received a letter from her confirming that there is no wrongdoing on the part of MAC. Shortly after that, Postmedia retracted the Toronto Sun articles, because they could not be substantiated."
