= Muhammad ibn Abd al-Aziz al-Dabbagh =

Muhammad bin Abdulaziz Al-Dabbagh
- Born: 1928
- Died: 27 August 2008 (aged 79–80); Fez, Morocco
- Notable work: “One of the Flags of Thought and Literature in the Marinid Era,”
- Style: Religious themes Political topics Social themes National themes

Muhammad ibn Abd al-Aziz al-Dabbagh (Arabic: محمد بن عبد العزيز الدباغ, romanized: Muḥammad ibn ʿAbd al-Azīz al-Dabbāgh) (1928 – 27 August 2008) was a Moroccan jurist and writer.

== Early life ==
Muhammad al-Dabbagh was born in Fes, Morocco where he was raised and studied. His origins go back to a family that was known in the city of Fes at the time.

== Career ==
Muhammad bin Abdulaziz Al-Dabbagh authored a number of books throughout his career in the field of writing and publishing. Perhaps the most prominent publication was the book “One of the Flags of Thought and Literature in the Marinid Era,” a book in which Muhammad bin Abdulaziz dealt with the most famous and prominent scholars of thought, literature and others in the Marinid era.

This book was of special interest to translation and media researchers at the time of its publication and in the period in which it was circulated, as it falls within the scope of translation works and the related branches of social thought and culture, which was not well known at the time and was not covered extensively.

== Death ==
Muhammad ibn Abd al-Aziz al-Dabbagh died in Fez on 27 August 2008.

== List of his works ==
This is a list of the most prominent works of the Moroccan writer, and jurist, Muhammad bin Abdulaziz Al-Dabbagh.

- “One of the Flags of Thought and Literature in the Marinid Era,”
