= Ingrid Mattson =

Canadian activist and scholar (born 1963)

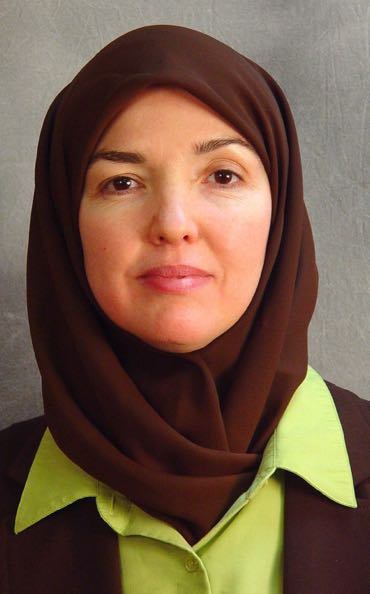
- Born: August 24, 1963 (age 63); Kingston, Ontario, Canada
- Occupations: Professor; activist; Islamic scholar

Academic background
- Education: University of Waterloo (BA, BFA); University of Chicago (PhD)

Academic work
- Institutions: Hartford Seminary; University of Western Ontario
- Website: ingridmattson.org

Ingrid Mattson (born August 24, 1963) is a Canadian activist and scholar. A professor of Islamic studies, she is currently the London and Windsor Community Chair in Islamic Studies at Huron University College at the University of Western Ontario in London, Ontario, Canada. Mattson is a former president of the Islamic Society of North America (ISNA) and was described as "perhaps the most noticed figure among American Muslim women" in a 2010 New York Times article.

== Early life and education ==
Ingrid Mattson, the sixth of seven children, was born in 1963 in Kingston, Ontario, where she spent her childhood and attended Catholic schools. She credits the Catholic women who educated her with providing "a fantastic education" and "a place to explore and develop this early, youthful spirituality".

She studied Philosophy and Fine Arts at the University of Waterloo in Canada from 1982–87. As part of her course of study, she spent summer of 1986 as a visiting student in Paris, France. During this time, she befriended West African students from a Sufi Muslim community. On reading the Qur'an, she found, "an awareness of God, for the first time since I was very young." After returning to Waterloo, she converted to Islam in 1987. She completed her studies in Waterloo and earned combined Bachelor of Arts degrees in Philosophy and Fine Arts in 1987.

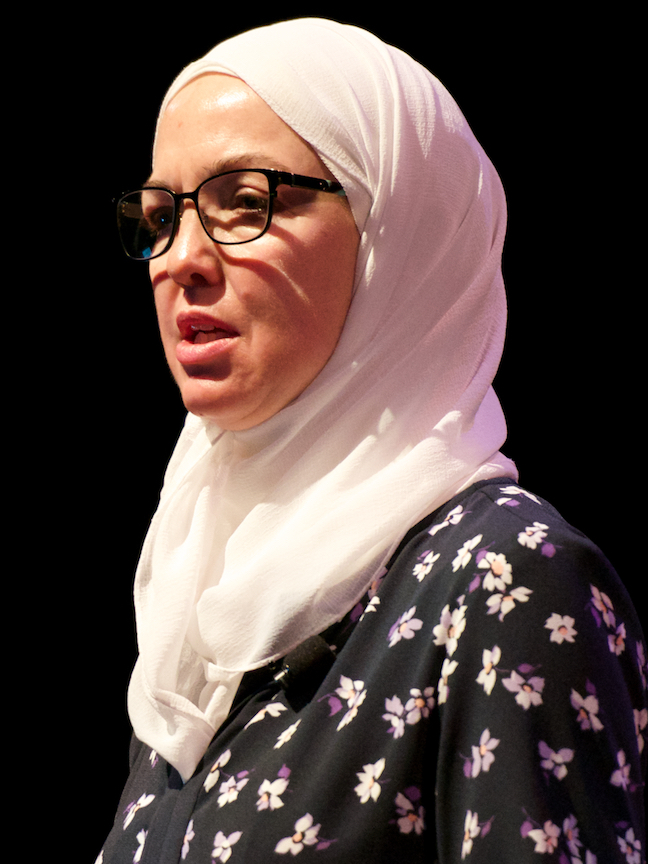
Mattson in 2017

Ingrid Mattson received a PhD in Near Eastern Languages and Civilizations from the University of Chicago in 1999, with a focus on Islamic law and society.

== Career ==
She served as a Professor of Islamic studies and Christian-Muslim Relations from 1998 to 2012 at Hartford Seminary in Connecticut. During that period, she founded the first accredited graduate program for Muslim chaplains in America. For a number of years she was also the Director of the MacDonald Center for the Study of Islam and Christian-Muslim Relations at Hartford Seminary.

While serving as the vice-president and president of the Islamic Society of North America, Mattson worked on a number of occasions with United States government officials. She provided consultation during the administrations of US Presidents George W. Bush and Barack Obama. This work focused on policies regarding violent extremism, Muslim-American military service, and protection of civil rights for Muslim-Americans. John O. Brennan, the Director of the CIA, when he was Deputy National Security Advisor for Homeland Security and Counterterrorism, and Assistant to President Obama thanked Mattson for her leadership at a public meeting at New York University.

Her work focuses on fostering positive relationships between groups of differing religious faiths. She is an advocate for interfaith engagement and multi-faith activism in the interest of the public good. She has spent her academic career teaching Islamic Studies and interfaith relations in historically Christian institutions. As ISNA president, Mattson established a national office for interfaith relations in Washington, DC in 2006. She invited Rabbi Eric Yoffie, President of the Union for Reform Judaism, to speak at the organization's annual convention in Chicago in 2006. Mattson spoke the next year at the group's Biennial where she received a standing ovation and announced "a new partnership that promotes interfaith dialogue and other relationship-building activities" between the two organizations. She also established programs with other Jewish organizations. The "Twinning Program" with the Foundation for Ethnic Understanding is one such program. Another is the three year "Jews and Muslims in America" program developed in cooperation with the Jewish Theological Seminary and funded by the Carnegie Institute.

Mattson has advocated for greater understanding and partnerships between Muslims and Buddhists as well. She shared the stage with the Dalai Lama on a number of occasions, including the "Seeds of Peace" program in Seattle in 2008, in Indiana in 2010, and in Chicago in 2011.

Mattson is an original signatory of "A Common Word" and has participated in many Christian-Muslim conferences and dialogues with the Jordanian Royal Aal al-Bayt Institute for Islamic Thought. Her leadership in interfaith cooperation has been recognized by Burt Visotzsky of the Jewish Theological Seminary of America. She was also awarded an honorary doctorate in 2012 by the Chicago Theological Seminary for her service to the faith community.

Her book, The Story of The Qur'an: its history and place in Muslim Life (now in its 2nd edition) was chosen in 2012 by the National Endowment for the Humanities for inclusion in its "Bridging Cultures" program.

In 2026, she was awarded an honorary Doctor of Divinity from Yale University.

== Views ==
=== Role of women in Islam ===
Mattson advocates for a greater public role for Muslim women as religious leaders. When she founded the first accredited graduate program for Muslim chaplains in the US, she insisted that it be open to women. Mattson wears a hijab, but argues that governments should have no authority to enforce religious dress or ban it. Mattson has worked with a Muslim social service agency called Peaceful Families. The group to advocates against domestic violence in the Muslim community and argues against interpretations of the Qur'an that permit violence to or discrimination against women.

Mattson is also the Founder and Director of The Hurma Project - an initiative to help Muslim communities prevent and act against spiritual and sexual abuse by those in position of religious authority and influence. She explained in an interview with Haute Hijab magazine that she was motivated to act after witnessing on multiple occasions how the community was not able to appropriately acknowledge and deal with such situations. She said, "I realized we needed something broad and interdisciplinary to examine the scope of the problem, have a good understanding of all of the dynamics and develop educational materials and processes that we can bring to the community."

=== Opposition to Islamic extremism ===
Mattson has been a critic of Islamic extremism since she first encountered the Taliban while trying to educate Afghan refugee girls in Pakistan. In the aftermath of the September 11 attacks, Mattson published an article on Beliefnet entitled "American Muslims have a Special Obligation." In the article, she stated, "I, as an American Muslim leader, denounce not only suicide bombers and the Taliban, but those leaders of other Muslim states who thwart democracy, repress women, use the Qur'an to justify un-Islamic behavior and encourage violence." Since the attacks of September 11, Mattson been interviewed many times on the radio. She has lectured publicly to denounce violence in the name of Islam and advocated for peaceful resolution of conflicts and differences. In a 2007 essay, Mattson condemned "Exclusivist, triumphalist, communal identities (religious or political)" that justify violent attacks on other groups. Mattson was one of the original signatories of the Amman Message that was an international Muslim response to sectarian violence and terrorism in the name of Islam.

== Interviews ==
- On WHYY's "Fresh Air" with Terry Gross "A Convert to Islam Takes Leadership Role," September 28, 2006
- On APM's "Speaking of Faith" with Krista Tippett "A New Voice for Islam," March 6, 2008
- The Spiritual Fallout of 9/11," September 5, 2002
- On WNPR’s "Where We Live" with John Dankoski "Christians and Muslims," February 13, 2008
- On WNPR's "Where We Live" with John Dankoski "Finding a Religious Common Ground," January 27, 2009
- On CBC's "The Sunday Edition" with Michael Enright "In Search of Moderate Muslims," January 4, 2010
- On WBEZ's Worldview" with Jerome McDonnell "Muslim Women’s Leadership," May 4, 2010

== See also ==
- List of University of Waterloo people
