= Rana Hamdy =

Egyptian footballer (born 1989)

Rana Hamdy رنا حمدي (Arabic)
Personal information
- Full name: Rana Amr Adly Abdel Aziz Hamdy
- Date of birth: 11 September 1989 (age 37)
- Place of birth: Saudi Arabia
- Position: Centre back

College career
Years	Team	Apps	(Gls)
2010	York Lions	0	(0)
2013–2015	George Brown Huskies	25	(0)

Senior career*
Years	Team	Apps	(Gls)
2018–2019	Oakville Blue Devils	19	(0)
2022–2023	Burlington SC	28	(0)

International career^{‡}
2016	Egypt	3	(0)
- * Club domestic league appearances and goals as of 22 July 2023 ‡ National team caps and goals as of 25 November 2016

Rana Amr Adly Abdel Aziz Hamdy (Arabic: رنا عمرو عدلي عبد العزيز حمدي; born 11 September 1989), also known as Rana Abdel Aziz, is a footballer who plays as a centre back. She has been a member of the Egypt women's national team.

== College career ==
From 2013 to 2015, she attended George Brown College where she played for the women's soccer team. In 2013, she was an OCAA League All-Star. In 2014, she was recognized last year for her work in the classroom and on the field, winning the Michael ‘Pinball’ Clemons award, while also being named and Ontario Colleges Athletic Association League All-Star and being awarded a Special Recognition Award. In 2015, she was named Female Athlete of the Year, earned a Contribution to Athletics Award and was the Women's Outdoor Soccer MVP.

== Club career ==
In 2018 and 2019, Hamdy played for Oakville Blue Devils FC in Canada in League1 Ontario. She won the league title with Oakville in 2019 becoming one of the first Egyptian women, along with teammate Mahira Ali to win a domestic league title.

In 2022 and 2023, she played for Burlington SC in League1 Ontario.

== International career ==
Hamdy played for Egypt at senior level during the 2016 Africa Women Cup of Nations.
