= Haroon Siddiqui =

Canadian journalist

Haroon Siddiqui, CM OOnt is an Indo-Canadian newspaper journalist, columnist and editorial page editor emeritus of the Toronto Star. He has reported from more than 50 countries and shaped media coverage of Canada for fifty years through ten prime ministers.

== Early life and career ==
Born in India, Siddiqui arrived in Canada in 1967 and briefly lived in Montreal and Toronto before moving to Brandon, Manitoba, to work at The Brandon Sun upon the recommendation of Clark Davey, then-managing editor of the Globe and Mail. In a 2023 interview, Siddiqui stated that prior to taking the job, he knew nothing about Brandon other than the fact that "it was very, very cold."

Siddiqui worked there for the next ten years, first as a reporter, then as editor, at a paper that he deemed "the Cadillac of small newspapers in Canada" in his memoir. In 1978, at the age of 36, he was offered jobs from Canada's two leading newspapers, the Globe and Mail and the Toronto Star.

During his 30-odd year tenure at the Toronto Star, Siddiqui worked as a foreign affairs analyst, columnist, national editor, and editorial page editor.

Siddiqui continued as a columnist at the Star until 2015. His farewell column of 1 April 2015 marked his retirement from journalism.

Siddiqui has also served in leadership roles in organizations such as the Canadian Newspaper Association, Canadian Managing Editors Conference, Canadian Civil Liberties Association, Advertising Standards Canada, the Ontario Press Council, Canadian Club Toronto, and the Urdu Literary Society of Canada.

== Awards and distinctions ==
He shared a 1983 National Newspaper Award for spot news reporting, and was shortlisted for editorial writing in 1992 and column writing in 1998. Siddiqui received a Professional Man of the Year award from the Indo-Canada Chamber of Commerce, and a media award from the Canadian Islamic Congress.

In 2000, and 2001 he became a member of the Order of Ontario, for crafting "a broader definition of the Canadian identity," inclusive of our First Nations, French Canadians and newer Canadians.

In 2001, Siddiqui was awarded an honorary Doctor of Letters from York University. In 2002, he was awarded the World Press Freedom Award by the National Press Club in Ottawa for his James Minifie Memorial Lecture at the University of Regina, warning against "creeping censorship" in Canada under media concentration.

In 2023, he was awarded the Lifetime Achievement from the Canadian Journalism Foundation in recognition of a decades-long groundbreaking career in Canadian journalism and his commitment to "diversity, journalistic integrity and social justice." He also published an autobiography My Name Is Not Harry: A Memoir.

== Criticisms ==
Writing in Toronto Life in June 2001, Robert Fulford maintained that "Siddiqui makes the most strenuous effort to bathe Third World countries in a soft light. No matter how outrageous its actions, a non-Western government can usually count on him for a little understanding."

In a June 2013 column, Siddiqui demanded that Canada's Minister of Citizenship and Immigration Jason Kenney "should resign or be fired." In an article the following month, Siddiqui accused Kenney of "turn[ing] immigration into a tool of anti-Arab and anti-Muslim bigotry", and of "barring refugee claimants from ‘safe third countries.'" Chris Selley, writing in the National Post, pointed out that immigration levels of individuals speaking Arabic as a first language have actually increased during Kenney's tenure. Regarding Siddiqui's second claim, Shelley argued that refugees from "safe third countries" are not automatically refused refugee status by Canada but rather are "directed them into an expedited system with a somewhat weaker appeals process." Selley also argued that Siddiqui's accusation against Kenney in this regard was "a massive factual error that you’d think an expert on this matter wouldn’t make."

== See also ==
- Siddiqui
