= Zijad Delić =

Canadian imam, activist, teacher and scholar (born 1965)

Dr. Zijad Delić (born 12 May 1965) is a Bosnian Canadian imam, activist, teacher, scholar and public speaker. He is the former executive director of the Canadian Islamic Congress (CIC).

== Early life and career ==
Delić was born and raised in Bosnia and Herzegovina. He attended Gazi Husrev-beg Secondary School in Sarajevo from 1980 to 1984. After high school, he completed a year of mandatory service in the Yugoslav Army from 1984 to 1985. After his military service, Delić studied at the Sarajevo Institute of Philosophy from 1985 to 1986. After deciding to take up Arabic studies at the International Islamic University in Islamabad, Pakistan where he earned a bachelor's degree in Arabic studies from 1986 to 1990.

Delić returned home to Bosnia, and worked in the business sector, as well as working as an imam. He went on to become head imam in the Croatian region of Dalmacija. During this time, the war in the Balkans broke out, and Delić worked as a coordinator for two humanitarian organizations helping Bosnians. Delić left the war-torn region with his wife and three-year-old daughter in August 1995, moving to Vancouver, British Columbia, Canada.

=== Canada ===
After arriving in Vancouver, Delić was hired by the British Columbia Muslim Association to serve as the imam of its mosque in Richmond, British Columbia a suburb of Vancouver. He would also go on to serve as an Islamic studies teacher and vice-principal of the association's B.C. Muslim School, and became a spokesperson for the Muslim community. Delić served the BCMA from 1995 to 2006.

Delić's appeared on radio and television programs across British Columbia. He also worked to forge strong relationships with Christian, Jewish, Sikh and Aboriginal leaders. As an imam, Delić led congregational prayers, taught religious classes, performed marriages and funerals, gave talks and lead youth camps and seminars. He also counseled prison inmates, visited hospital patients, received tour groups from non-Muslim communities, and gave lectures at schools and universities about Islam.

While working for the BCMA, Delić completed his Master of Science in Education at the University of Oregon in 2001. In 2006, he earned his PhD from the Faculty of Education at Simon Fraser University.

In 2008, he was commissioned by the Canadian government's Department of Heritage to conduct a comparative study on Muslim integration in Canada, France and Bosnia. In this study, Delić suggests that for Canada's Muslims, Canada's multiculturalism model opens up opportunities to renew and reform their communal outlook within mainstream society while maintaining their religious beliefs. He argues that "this approach is unlike the one experienced by Muslims in France who live in a model of systemic assimilation or Muslims of Bosnia who were politically and socially under pressure to abandon their religious beliefs and become 'others'" (Delić, 2008). He argues the major difference is that Canada consciously and officially defines itself as a multicultural state in that it not only tolerates but also welcomes people with a variety of ethnic origins, respects minority religions and cultures, and has made constitutional commitments to this end.

Delić had been invited to speak on 4 October 2010 to a gathering at National Defence Headquarters celebrating Islamic Heritage Month, but his invitation was revoked by then-Defence Minister Peter MacKay on three days' notice. MacKay's spokesperson cited comments made in 2006 by a former president of the Canadian Islamic Congress as the reason. The National Post published the text of Delić's undelivered speech the following day, while conservative blogger Arnie Lemaire claimed credit for influencing the minister's decision.

== Views ==
=== Islamic extremism ===
In 2003, Delić was interviewed by The Vancouver Sun newspaper after Imam Gamal Solaiman called Muslims to wage attacks on American troops in the Middle East. Delić criticized the imam's speech stating that instead, Muslim leaders should "say that nobody has a right to kill innocent people and destroy the future of children and their possibilities in life."

In October 2004, a tape was sent to a media outlet of a speech by Vancouver-based Imam Younus Kathrada who preached at the Dar al-Madinah Islamic Society. On the tape, Kathrada delivered a lecture in which he called Jews the "brothers of monkeys and swine." The Canadian Jewish Congress filed a formal complaint with the hate crimes unit of the Vancouver Police, and Kathrada was the subject of a joint Royal Canadian Mounted Police-Vancouver Police investigation. Delić, who was the imam in the nearby suburb of Richmond at the time, criticized Kathrada's comments. He said "[Kathrada] does not represent me or other Muslims." He added "You can't bring Saudi Arabia into Canada." Delić also told The Richmond Review newspaper that he worried about the damage the incident caused in the Muslim community and specifically the impact it might have had on Muslim youth.

=== Interfaith activity ===
Delić introduced regular interfaith programs while working in British Columbia. In April 2004, he helped organize a meeting between Muslim leaders and rabbis and members of the Beth Tikvah and Ahavat Olam Synagogues in the Vancouver area. The purpose of this groundbreaking discussion was to reach out across the divide between the Muslim and Jewish communities. This led to the creation of the annual Muslim-Jewish Peace Walk. In 2007, Delić became the first Muslim ever to be a guest speaker at the Canadian Conference of Catholic Bishops in Cornwall, Ontario. At the conference, Delić shared the story of how his best friend was a Catholic while growing up in Bosnia, and how they had been oblivious to the ethnic and religious conflict around them. Delić has also lectured at Ottawa's Lay School of Theology, a school sponsored jointly by the Anglican Diocese of Ottawa, and by the Ottawa Presbyteries of the Presbyterian and United Churches.

== Personal ==
Delić lives in Ottawa, Ontario.
