= Hasan Amat =

Hasan Amat (alternatively Hason or Hassan; 1894–1917) was a Canadian soldier. Hasan Amat was born in Singapore in 1894, then part of the British Straits Settlements. He served as a private in the Royal Canadian Regiment, the 4th Overseas Pioneer Battalion, and the 1st Canadian Infantry Battalion. Amat died at the Battle of Hill 70; he was one of 22 Muslim Canadians to serve and the only one to die in the First World War. He is recognized on the Vimy Memorial.

== Early life ==
Hasan Amat was born in Singapore in 1894, then part of the British Straits Settlements. Little is known about his early life before he later immigrated to Canada.

== First World War service ==
During the First World War, Amat enlisted in the Canadian Expeditionary Force. He served as a private in a Canadian infantry unit that was part of the Canadian Corps on the Western Front in France.

== Death ==
Amat was killed in action on 20 August 1917 during the Battle of Hill 70, a major Canadian Corps offensive fought near Lens, France. The battle formed part of a series of operations conducted by the Canadian Corps in the summer of 1917.

== Legacy ==
Because his body was not recovered or identified after the battle, Amat has no known grave. He is commemorated on the Vimy Memorial, which lists members of the Canadian Expeditionary Force who died in France and have no known resting place.

Historical research, including Richard Holt's Filling the Ranks: Manpower in the Canadian Expeditionary Force, 1914–1918 (2017) and archival notes held by the Royal Canadian Regiment Museum in London, Ontario, identifies Amat as one of approximately 22 known Muslim soldiers who served in the Canadian Expeditionary Force during the First World War, and the only one known to have been killed in action during the conflict.
