= Hamid Slimi =

Canadian imam

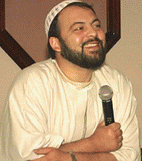
Imam Hamid Slimi

Hamid Slimi is a Canadian imam and the founder of Sayeda Khadija Centre in Mississauga.

== Career ==
Slimi is the founder and president of Faith of Life Network, the Founder and Chairman of the Canadian Centre for Deen Studies, the former Chairman of the Canadian Council of Imams (2006-2013) and a lecturer at the Islamic Institute of Toronto.

In 2009, Slimi was featured by Georgetown University as one of the 500 Most influential Muslims in the World.

In addition to the traditional degrees known as Ijazah, he holds two master's degrees with High Honors in both disciplines from Morocco and the US and a PhD in Islamic Law from the U.K. He received both his traditional and academic learning in Morocco and attended other renowned institutions and universities in other parts of the world.

Slimi was considered as a candidate to play a role in Canadian former Guantanamo detainee Omar Khadr's rehabilitation, after he returns to Canada. Khadr's attorney, Lieutenant Commander William C. Kuebler, suggested Slimi draft a "religious rehabilitation" program, to prepare for Khadr's return.

Kuebler describes Slimi as a "bridge-builder". In 2008, Slimi became "the first Muslim to address Toronto's Neighbourhood Interfaith Group".
