= Shireen Ahmed =

Canadian journalist, advocate for gender equity in sports

- Born: Halifax, Canada
- Education: University of Toronto
- Known for: Sports activism, writing, and public speaking
- Website: http://www.shireenahmed.com/

Shireen Ahmed is a Canadian writer, public speaker, and award-winning sports activist focusing on Muslim women in sports, as well as the intersections of racism and misogyny in sports.

== Work ==
Ahmed is well-known in the women in sports industry, a frequent commentator around intersectionality and freedom of identity practice within sports. In an interview with The McGill Daily, Ahmed explained what being a sports activist was:

"Advocating for equality and social justice by means of sports and advocating for the inclusion of Muslim and athletes of colour in sport. Sertaç Sehlikoglu, curator of Muslim women in Sports blog, coined the term."

Ahmed actively engages with media producers in mainstream and alternative groups. In one example, Ahmed responded to a documentary film about a women's soccer team in Zanzibar. In an interview with researchers for the study, "Radical Sports Journalism?: Reflections on 'Alternative' Approaches to Covering Sport-Related Social Issues," Ahmed explained, "The title of the movie was 'From Veils to Cleats.' I emailed them through Facebook. I didn't call them out. Basically, I said, when you use that title you're saying you can be either veiled or unveiled – that's it…If those women decide to take off their veils while they're playing that's their choice as long as they have a safe space to do it, but a lot of the women on that team don't unveil while they play so what are you actually saying here? So, they changed the title of their movie, which I felt was huge."

She is part of the weekly podcast, Burn It All Down, the first feminist sports podcast to analyze sports culture from an intersectional feminist lens. Her co-hosts are Hofstra University History Professor Brenda Elsey, author and sportswriter Jessica Luther, Lindsay Gibbs of ThinkProgress, and Penn State University Professor of History and Women's Gender, and Sexuality Studies Amira Rose Davis. They have interviewed guests like ESPN's Jemele Hill, legendary sportscaster Andrea Kremer, WNBA's Layshia Clarendon and Essence Carson, and Brazilian soccer legends Sissi and Tafa.

== Personal life ==
Ahmed was born to Pakistani parents in Halifax, Canada. She attended the University of Toronto in Canada, and played soccer during college. Ahmed now lives in Toronto, Canada with her family.

== Honors and awards ==
Ahmed received the 2018 Naiem Malik Memorial Award for her advocacy work around Muslim women in sports. She was also named to the Muslim Women in Sports Powerlist in 2018 and 2019.
