= Al-Rashid Mosque =

Mosque in Edmonton, Alberta, Canada

- French: Mosquée Al-Rashid
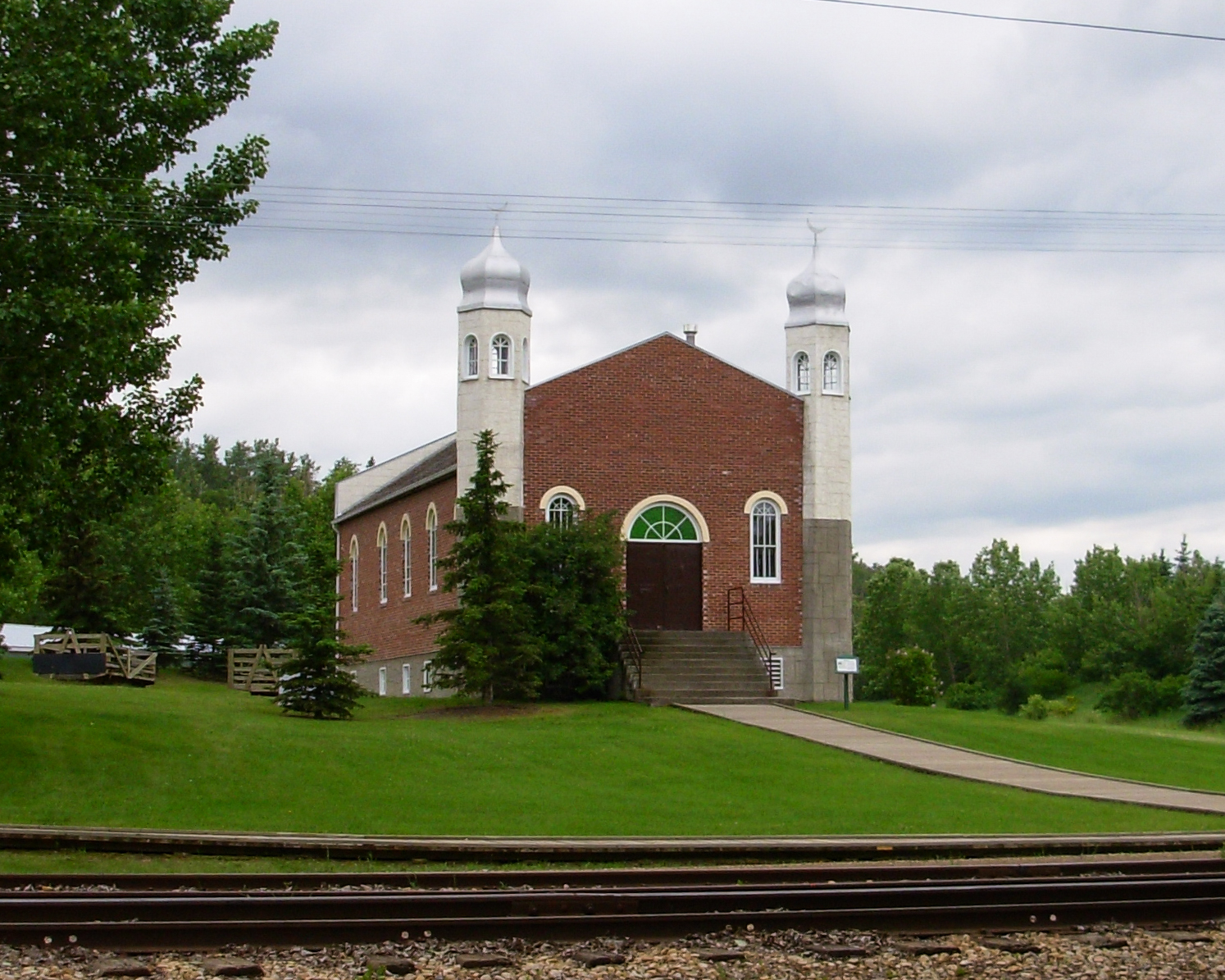

- Location in Alberta

Religion
- Affiliation: Sunni Islam
- Ecclesiastical or organisational status: Mosque
- Status: Active

Location
- Location: Fort Edmonton Park, Edmonton, Alberta
- Country: Canada
- Coordinates: 53°30′06″N 113°34′41″W

Architecture
- Type: Mosque
- Style: Eastern Orthodox
- Completed: 1938 (first site); 1940s (second site); 1992 (current site)
- Minaret: 2

Website
- alrashidmosque.ca

The Al-Rashid Mosque (French: Mosquée Al-Rashid) was the first mosque built in Canada. It was constructed in 1938 in Edmonton, Alberta, and relocated to its current site in Fort Edmonton Park, in 1992. The mosque serves the Sunni Muslim community.

== History ==
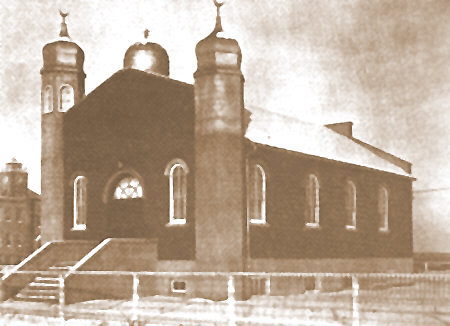
Al-Rashid Mosque at its opening in 1938

Al-Rashid Mosque was expected to be the first mosque in North America. However, it was built in 1938, just after the Mother Mosque of America in Cedar Rapids, Iowa and several years after the 1929 mosque built in Ross, North Dakota. At the time, there were about 700 Muslims in Canada. Members of Edmonton's Muslim community approached Edmonton Mayor John Fry about purchasing land to construct the mosque. A group of dedicated individuals travelled the province to raise money from Muslims in small communities. They also held bakes sales and collected funds from Jews, Christians and Muslims to construct the mosque.

The mosque was built by Ukrainian-Canadian contractor Mike Drewoth in a style resembling the Eastern Christian (Ukrainian Catholic and Orthodox) immigrant churches and opened on December 12, 1938. In the 1940s, the building was relocated from its original site to a location a few blocks away to make room for a school expansion.

By the 1980s, the mosque had been outgrown by the booming Muslim community, and had fallen into disrepair. The city, which owned the land on which it was located, was contemplating demolition of the site to expand a hospital. However, in 1991, it was decided that the mosque was to be moved to Fort Edmonton Park at a cost of $75,000. About a year later, on May 28, 1992, it was reopened in the park.

== See also ==
- Islam in Canada
- List of mosques in Canada
