= Wafa Dabbagh =

Canadian military officer

Wafa Dabbagh (died 5 June 2012) was a Canadian military officer. She was the first Canadian Armed Forces member to wear a hijab.

Born to a Palestinian family in Egypt and raised in Kuwait, Dabbagh emigrated to Canada and joined the Canadian Armed Forces in 1996 after "accidentally wandering into a recruiting office in Windsor". She served with the naval reserves and was a participant in Operation Proteus in 2007, a mission to train security forces in Palestine. She attained the rank of lieutenant-commander, but was prevented from seeking promotion to command by a cancer diagnosis in 2010.

Dabbagh died of lung cancer in Ottawa in 2012. Shortly before her death she received the Queen's Diamond Jubilee Medal.
