= Burlington SC (Ontario Premier League) =

Canadian soccer team

- Full name: Burlington Soccer Club
- Nickname: Bayhawks
- Founded: 1962; 64 years ago
- Stadium: Corpus Christi CSS
- Capacity: 1000
- Head Coach: Mark Worton (men); TBD (women)
- League: League1 Ontario
- 2025: L1O-P, 8th (men); L1O-C, 9th (women)
- Website: https://burlingtonsoccer.com/
Home colours	Away colours

Burlington Soccer Club is a Canadian semi-professional soccer club based in Burlington, Ontario that plays in the Ontario Premier League. The club's men's team plays in the first tier, while the women's team plays in Ontario Premier League 2.

== History ==
The club was founded in 1962 under the name Burlington Police Minor Soccer. In 1975, the club incorporated and changed their name to Burlington Youth Soccer Club; soon after in 1979, they won their first Ontario Cup. The club has created an Embracing Ability program designed to make soccer accessible for all including players with intellectual and physical disabilities. After greatly expanding their adult program, they again renamed the club in 2019 to Burlington Soccer Club. The club's competitive teams are known as the Burlington Bayhawks, with their team mascot being named Burli the Bayhawk.

The club joined League1 Ontario for the 2022 after acquiring the license previously held by 1812 FC Barrie. They will be entering teams in both the male and female divisions, along with a men's reserve team in 2022, and adding a women's reserve team in 2023.

In June 2024, the club formed a development partnership with Canadian Premier League club Forge FC.

== Seasons ==
=== Men ===
Season	League	Teams	Record	Rank	Playoffs	League Cup	Ref
2022	League1 Ontario	22	4–7–10	17th	Did not qualify	not held	
2023	League1 Ontario	22	12–3–5	5th	Quarter-finals	not held	
2024	League1 Ontario Premier	12	9–2–11	8th	–	Quarter-finals	
2025	League1 Ontario Premier	11	8–0–12	8th	–	Quarter-finals	

=== Women ===
Season	League	Teams	Record	Rank	Playoffs	League Cup	Ref
2022	League1 Ontario	20	1–0–18	20th	Did not qualify	–	
2023	League1 Ontario	19	3–2–13	18th	Did not qualify	–	
2024	League1 Ontario Championship	10	4–7–7	7th	–	Round of 32	
2025	League1 Ontario Championship	9	3–1–12	9th	–	Round of 32	

== Notable players ==
The following players have either played at the professional or international level, either before or after playing for the League1 Ontario team:

=== Men ===
- (Canada) Leaford Allen
- (Canada) Obrad Bejatovic
- (Guyana) (Canada) Daniel Jodah
- (Canada) Jace Kotsopoulos
- (Albania) (Canada) Romedi Llapi
- (Canada) Simon Triantafillou

=== Women ===
- (Egypt) Rana Hamdy
