= Nandi =

Nandi may refer to:

== People ==
- Nandy (surname), Indian surname
- Nandi (mother of Shaka) (1760–1827), daughter of Bhebe of the Langeni tribe
- Onandi Lowe (born 1974), Jamaican footballer nicknamed Nandi
- Nandi Bushell (born 2010), South African-British drummer and musician
- Nandi Madida (born 1988), South African actress, musician and TV personality
- Nandi Nyembe (1950–2025), South African actress
- Nandi Rose Plunkett, Indian-American musician
- Nandi Thimmana, 16th-century Indian poet
- Nandivarman II (718–796) Pallava ruler in India
- Nandivarman III (r. 846–869), Pallava ruler in India
- Nandi Yellaiah (1942–2020), Indian politician

== Places ==
- Nandi, Belgaum, Karnataka, India
- Nandi, Queensland, Australia
- The old spelling for Nadi, Fiji
- Nandi Bagan, neighbourhood in Kolkata in West Bengal, India
- Nandi County (formerly Nandi District), Kenya
- Nandi Firozpur, village in Uttar Pradesh, India
- Nandi Hills (disambiguation)
  - Nandi Hills, India
  - Nandi Hills, Kenya
- Nandi Temple (disambiguation)
  - Nandi Temple, Khajuraho India
- Nandi Wanaparthy, Ranga Reddy district, village in Telangana, India
- Nandi, village in Chikkaballapur district of Karnataka, India
  - Arunachaleswara Temple, Nandi

== Other ==
- Nāndi, an offering of food in Khoja ritual
- Nandi (Hinduism), the bull-mount of the Hindu deity Shiva
- Nandi Awards, film awards given to Tollywood personalities and films
- Nandi languages
- Nandi people, an ethnic group from East Africa
- Maha Nandi, 2005 Indian film

== See also ==
- Nandi language (disambiguation)
- Naandi (disambiguation)
- Nandhi (disambiguation)
- Nandy (disambiguation)
