= Esmaili =

Esmaili (Persian: اسماعيلی) may refer to:

== Places ==
- Esmaili, Iran, a village in Kerman Province
- Esmaili-ye Olya (disambiguation)
  - Esmaili-ye Olya, Ilam
  - Esmaili Olya, Kerman
- Esmaili-ye Sofla (disambiguation)
  - Esmaili-ye Sofla, Ilam
  - Esmaili Sofla, Kerman
- Esmaili District, in Kerman Province
- Esmaili Rural District, in Kerman Province

== People ==
=== Esmaeili ===
- Ali Esmaeili (born 1996), Iranian footballer
- Fariborz Esmaeili (1940–2020), Iranian footballer
- Farshid Esmaeili (born 1994), Iranian footballer
- Lazım Esmaeili (also "Lazem") (1945–1995), Kurdish Iranian spy operating in Turkey
- Mohammad Esmaeili (born 1960), Iranian conservative politician
- Mohsen Esmaeili (born 1964), Iranian consulting jurist and member of both the Guardian Council and Assembly of Experts
- Tareq Esmaeili (born 1977), Qatari cyclist

=== Esmaili ===
- Ardalan Esmaili (born 1986), Iranian-born Swedish actor
- Farzad Esmaili (born 1972), Iranian military officer, a commander of the Iranian Air Defense Force
- Habiballah Esmaili, Iranian historian

== See also ==
- Ismaili (disambiguation), variant of Arabic-based Ismaili / Ismaily
- Ismaili (surname), variant of Arabic-based Ismaili / Smaily
