= Isma'ili Constitution =

Governance structure of Nizari Ismaili Muslims

The Nizari Isma'ilis around the globe are governed by one universal constitution known as "The World Constitution".

== The Constitution ==
The Constitution gives a unifying structure of governance to all Nizaris and their religiously based institutions, who are established in more than 25 countries and territories around the globe. Due to the differing social, economic, and political realities faced by the Nizari diaspora, the constitution has built-in flexibility, allowing various communities the ability to propose rules and regulations unique to individual communities, while retaining the overall unity of framework with all other communities, through detailed provisions within the constitution.

=== The affirmation of fundamental Islamic beliefs ===
The Constitution affirms all the fundamental Islamic beliefs and then clearly focuses on the doctrine of the Imamate as envisioned within Nizari theology. It sets out the essence of Isma'ili Shi'i beliefs, affirming the Shahada and that Islam, as revealed in the Quran, is the final message of God to mankind, and is universal and eternal. The Preamble states the authority of the Imam in the Isma'ili tariqa (path) and that allegiance to the Imam unites all Ismā'īlī Muslims worldwide in their "loyalty, devotion and obedience to the Imam within the Islamic concept of universal brotherhood". It further states that, from the time of Ali bin Abu Talib, the Imams have given rules of conduct and constitutions in conformity with "the Islamic concepts of unity, brotherhood, justice, tolerance and goodwill".

=== The development of the constitution ===
The development of the constitution began in March 1964, after Imam Karim al-Husayni, known as "Aga Khan IV", ordained the formation of a Constitutional Committee of Review which sought to produce a report on the needs and circumstances facing diaspora communities. In 1984 a series of field reports were conducted in Africa, Europe, North America, the Middle East, and South Asia. The reports were submitted to the Secretariat of the Imam at Aiglemont outside of Paris, France. Community leaders were then encouraged to offer constructive input. The constitution was signed into effect by the Imam on 13 December 1986, at 11 am, at a ceremony in Geneva, Switzerland.

The 1986 constitution has been repealed and the new Constitution was promulgated by Mawlana Hazar Imam on July 11, 1998, coinciding with completion of forty one years of his spiritual leadership. and the flag is used in official meetings of the Imam.

== Establishment of Ismaili Institutions ==
As Daryoush Mohammad Poor explains in his book Authority without Territory, the Nizari Ismailis have formed a diaspora, and the Imam has directed them to stay loyal to the governments of the countries they live in. Institutions help the Ismailis also have a connection to their religion so that they stay faithful, even as they prioritize their countries of residence. These institutions provide leadership for the community, and an outlet for the community to stay loyal. This Constitution sets up the institutions, and ultimately “regulates the relationship between the Imam and the members of this community.”

=== Leaders’ International Forum ===
Article 4 of the Ismaili Constitution establishes the Leaders’ International Forum, which according to Section 4.3, meets periodically to discuss “any matters, activities, interests or questions affecting the Jamat” to the Imam. It can make suggestions on how to respond to these matters, but only the Imam has the power to act on these recommendations. Section 4.4 establishes the structure of the Forum: there will be a chairman and members chosen from Presidents of the National Councils and otherwise appointed by the Imam. The chairman cannot be a National Council President. Both the chairman and the non-President members have term limits set by the Imam, while the members who are National Council Presidents serve on the National Council as long as they are Presidents.

=== Councils ===
Article 5 establishes various Councils. Section 5.1 creates three levels of councils: national, regional, and local. The purpose of the Councils, as described in Section 5.5, is to aid in the “social governance, administration, guidance, supervision and co-ordination of the activities of the Jamat.” This can manifest in any different goals, including facilitating volunteering, preserving Ismaili history, and developing programming to improve the Jamat's quality of life.

Section 5.2 establishes National Councils in the 14 countries specified in the First Schedule, and Section 5.4 allows those National Councils to establish Regional and Local Councils as necessary. According to Section 5.7, every National Council has a President, vice-president, and the Chairmen of the Central Institutions, and if applicable, the Presidents of Local and Regional Councils. The Councils may also consist of other appointed members. Section 5.8 sets the term limit for the President and vice-president to be three years, and for the other members to be the same as the term of their coexisting positions (i.e. a Local Council President would be a member of the National Council as long as they serve as the President of their Local Council).

=== Apex Institutions ===
Apex Institutions, established in Article 6, are created to serve specific goals. Section 6.2 establishes them according to the Second Schedule, which lists four institutions: the Aga Khan Foundation, Aga Khan University, Aga Khan Fund for Economic Development, and Aga Khan Trust for Culture.

=== Tariqah and Religious Education Boards ===
Section 8.1 establishes a Tariqah and Religious Education Board for the various countries listed in the Fourth Schedule. Some of the duties of the Tariqah and Religious Education Boards, listed in Section 8.4, include developing and teaching a religious education curriculum, and supporting research and book publications centered around Islam and Ismaili Tariqah. Each board is composed of a chairman, Honorary Secretary, and other appointed members (all of whom serve terms of three years), as well as Regional and Local Board Chairmen, and the Mukhi of the region (whose terms on the Board are to last as long as the terms of these other positions they hold).

=== Grants and Review Boards ===
The Imam and Jamats may grant money to other institutions, which is facilitated by the Grants and Review Boards created in Article 9. These Boards distribute the grant money, and ensure that the money is being used properly. Each has a chairman, Honorary Secretary, and other appointed members. All of these members have terms of three years. The Fifth Schedule outlines the 11 territories that have a Grants and Review Board, which may create smaller Local and Regional Boards.

=== Darkhanas and Principal Jamatkhanas ===
Article 10 grants the Imam power to designate a jamatkhana as a darkhana, which is the Imam's regional headquarters. According to the Sixth Schedule, the six darkhanas are in: Burnaby, British Columbia, Canada; Khadak, Bombay, Maharashtra, India; Moi Avenue, Nairobi, Kenya; Garden East, Karachi, Sindh, Pakistan; Mosque Street, Dar es Salaam, Tanzania; Cromwell Gardens, South Kensington, London, UK.

=== Mukhis and Kamadias ===
The Rules and Regulations of the Shia Imami Ismaili Muslims in the United States of America clarifies the responsibilities of the Mukhis and Kamadias of jamatkhanas. These duties include performing rituals, registering events like births and marriages, maintaining order at their jamatkhana, and helping the Councils and other local institutions. Article 11 of the Constitution states that the Imam will decide “the appointment of Mukhis and Kamadias and their powers, duties, functions, term of office and other related matters.”

=== Conciliation and Arbitration Boards ===
Article 12 establishes an International Conciliation and Arbitration Board, composed of a chairman and six members, all of whom have three-year terms. This Board is a judicial body that resolves dispute, both civil and domestic, between an Ismaili and a party in another country. It also hears disputes that are unresolved from the National Conciliation and Arbitration Boards, which are created in Article 13.

There are eleven National Conciliation and Arbitration Boards as defined in the Seventh Schedule, for the following countries: Canada, France, India, Kenya, Malagasy Republic, Pakistan, Portugal, Syria, Tanzania, the United Kingdom, and the United States. They have the same judicial responsibilities as the International Board, but focus on disputes between an Ismaili and another party in the same region. Each has a chairman and four members, all of whom have three-year terms.

As described in Article 14, Regional and National Conciliation and Arbitration Boards are also in charge of disciplinary action. They have the authority to make an Ismaili take actions such as paying compensation, observing religious rites, or even be expelled from the Jamat for the following offenses:

Any Ismaili shall be liable to disciplinary action who:

1. subjects to contempt or ridicule the Holy Quran, the Holy Prophet, the Ahl-al-Bayt, Mawlana Hazar Imam, this Constitution, any Rules and Regulations, any Farman, or any Ismaili religious literature or any rite or practice;

2. engages in activity aimed at creating unnecessary conflict between any of the tariqahs of Islam or between Islam and other religions;

3. without the permission in writing of the National Council obtained through the Regional Council within whose jurisdiction he resides, prints, publishes, or circulates any material or makes any statement or convenes a meeting or assembly purporting to be on behalf of or in the name of or relating to Mawlana Hazar Imam, the Ismaili Tariqah, the Jamat, any Council or any other Ismaili institutions;

4. conducts himself in a manner likely to offend the religious sentiments of the Jamat, or to cause disaffection in the Jamat, or to create disturbance or nuance in any Jamatkhana or any assembly of the Jamat, or acts in any other manner prejudicial to the dignity or prestige of the Jamat;

5. disregards any order made by a Council in accordance with the Constitution or any Rules and Regulations or fails to appear without just cause when requested to appear before a Council or Board; and

6. commits a breach of this Constitution or any Rules and Regulations or aids or abets any person to contravene any provision of this Constitution or any Rules and Regulations.

Anyone charged with an offense may appear before the National Council, who can approve, deny, or modify the proposed disciplinary action. Those who are expelled may submit an application to the National Council to be re-admitted, and if they die, may still have Ismaili burial and funeral rites.

Article 15 says that Ismailis’ personal law (i.e. law relating to personal relationships) is defined by the Shia Imami Ismaili School of Thought of Islam, which only the Imam may interpret.

=== Other Institutions ===
Article 16 creates the Ismaili flag and the Imamat Crest. It also protects the flag, the Imam's name and personal information, and photos of the Imam from being used for non-approved purposes.

Article 17 declares that only the Imam can create and grant titles, awards, and medals.

== See also ==
- Nāndi
- Du'a karavi
- Jama'at Khana
- Holy Du'a
- List of Ismaili imams
- Aga Khan Development Network
