= Ismaili (disambiguation) =

Isma'ilism is a branch or sub-sect of Shia Islam.

Ismaili (Arabic: اسماعيلي) or the variant Ismaily may also refer to:

== Ismaili ==
- Ismaili (surname), individuals with the surname or patronymic
- Nizari Isma'ilism or al-Nizāriyyūn, a branch of the Ismaili Shi'i Muslims after the Twelvers
  - Ismāʻīlī Constitution, a universal constitution governing the Ismaili Shia Muslims
- Ismaili Centre, a series of centres mainly belonging to Ismaili trends
  - Ismaili Centre, Dushanbe, Tajikistan
  - Ismaili Centre, London
  - Ismaili Centre, Toronto, Ontario, Canada
  - The Ismaili Centre, Burnaby, near Vancouver, British Columbia, Canada
  - The Ismaili Centre, Lisbon
- Ismaili railway station, railway station located in Pakistan

== Ismaily ==
- Ismaily, a Brazilian footballer
- Ismaily SC, an Egyptian sports club

== See also ==
- Nizari Ismaili state, also called the Alamut State, a Shia Nizari Ismaili state founded by the Order of Assassins under Hassan-i Sabbah
- Esmaili (disambiguation), a Persian-language variant of Ismaili
