= Esmaili-ye Olya =

Esmaili-ye Olya or Esmaili Olya (Persian: اسماعيلي عليا) may refer to:

- Esmaili-ye Olya, Ilam
- Esmaili Olya, Kerman
