= Vishvanatha Temple, Khajuraho =

Vishvanatha Temple
- Vishwanath Mandir
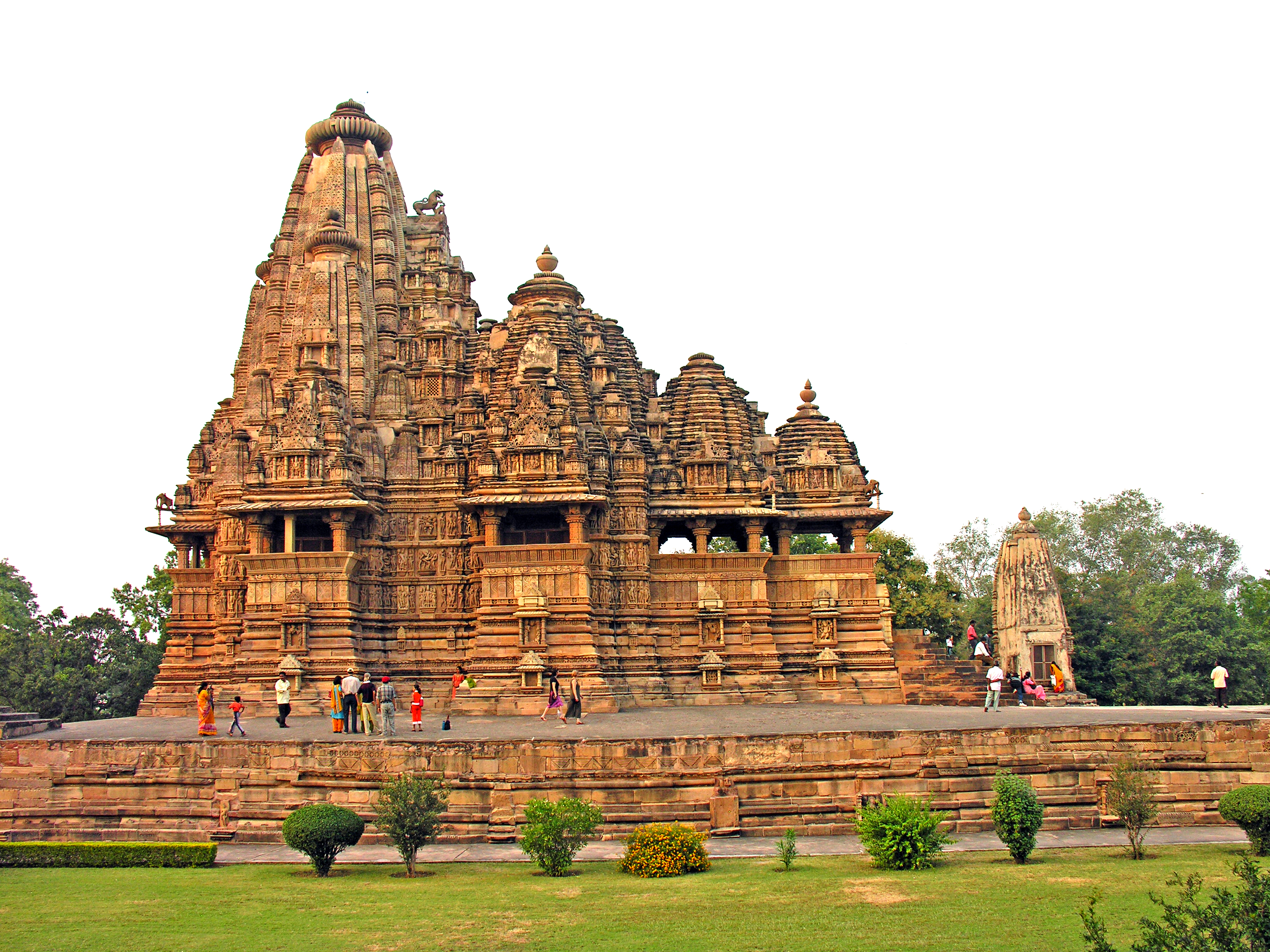

- Location in India

Religion
- Affiliation: Hinduism
- District: Chhatarpur
- Deity: Shiva
- Governing body: Archaeological Survey of India (ASI)

Location
- Location: Khajuraho
- State: Madhya Pradesh
- Country: India
- Interactive map of Vishvanatha Temple
- Coordinates: 24.853303°N 79.922613°E

Architecture
- Architect: Chhichha
- Type: Central Indian nagara
- Established: 999 CE or 1002 CE
- Elevation: 223 m (732 ft)

The Vishvanatha Temple is a Hindu temple in Madhya Pradesh, India. It is located among the western group of Khajuraho Monuments, a UNESCO World Heritage site. The temple is dedicated to Shiva, who is also known as "Vishvanatha" (IAST: Viśvanātha), meaning "Lord of the Universe".

The temple is believed to have been commissioned by the Chandela king Dhanga, and was probably completed in 999 CE or 1002 CE. Its architectural style is similar to that of the older Lakshmana Temple and the newer Kandariya Mahadeva Temple. It features several sculptures of various deities, surasundaris (celestial maidens), couples making love, and mythical creatures.

== History ==
A dedicatory inscription, now affixed to the porch of the Vishvanatha temple, provides information about the construction of a Shiva temple by the Chandela king Dhanga. The original date of the inscription is read variously as 1056 VS (999 CE) or 1059 VS (1002 CE).

The inscription mentions that Dhanga's descendant Jayavarman had it re-written in clear letters in 1173 VS. It states that Dhanga constructed a magnificent Shiva temple with two lingas (symbols of Shiva). One linga – Marakateshvara ("Emerald Lord") – was made of emerald. The other linga – Pramathanatha ("Lord of Pramathas or goblin-like spirits") – was made of stone. The inscription appears to have been issued after Dhanga's death: it states that after living for more than a hundred years, Dhanga attained moksha by abandoning his body in the waters of Ganga and Yamuna. Unlike some other Chandela temple inscriptions, it does not mention the Pratihara overlords of the Chandelas. This suggests that the Chandelas were no longer vassals of the Pratiharas by this time. The bit about the emerald linga (possibly an emerald-studded linga) also supports this theory. According to the Puranas, a jewel-studded linga is an appropriate donation to be made upon the fulfilment of a desire. This suggests that Dhanga built the temple after attaining a high political status as a sovereign.

Based on this inscription, scholars believe that the temple was completed in 999 CE or 1002 CE. However, according to art historian Shobita Punja, the temple referred to in this record may or may not be the Vishvanatha temple. According to her, there is a possibility that Dhanga built two temples, one with a stone linga and another with an emerald linga.

The inscription names Chhichha (or Chiccha) as the architect of the temple. It states that the temple's torana (gateway) was designed by Vishvakarma (the patron deity of architects), who had entered the architect's body.

== Architecture ==
The Vishvanatha temple is characteristic of the Central Indian architectural style that begins with Lakshmana Temple (c. 930–950 CE) and culminates with the Kandariya Mahadeva Temple (c. 1030 CE). These three temples represent the most fully developed style at Khajuraho.

Comparison with related temples

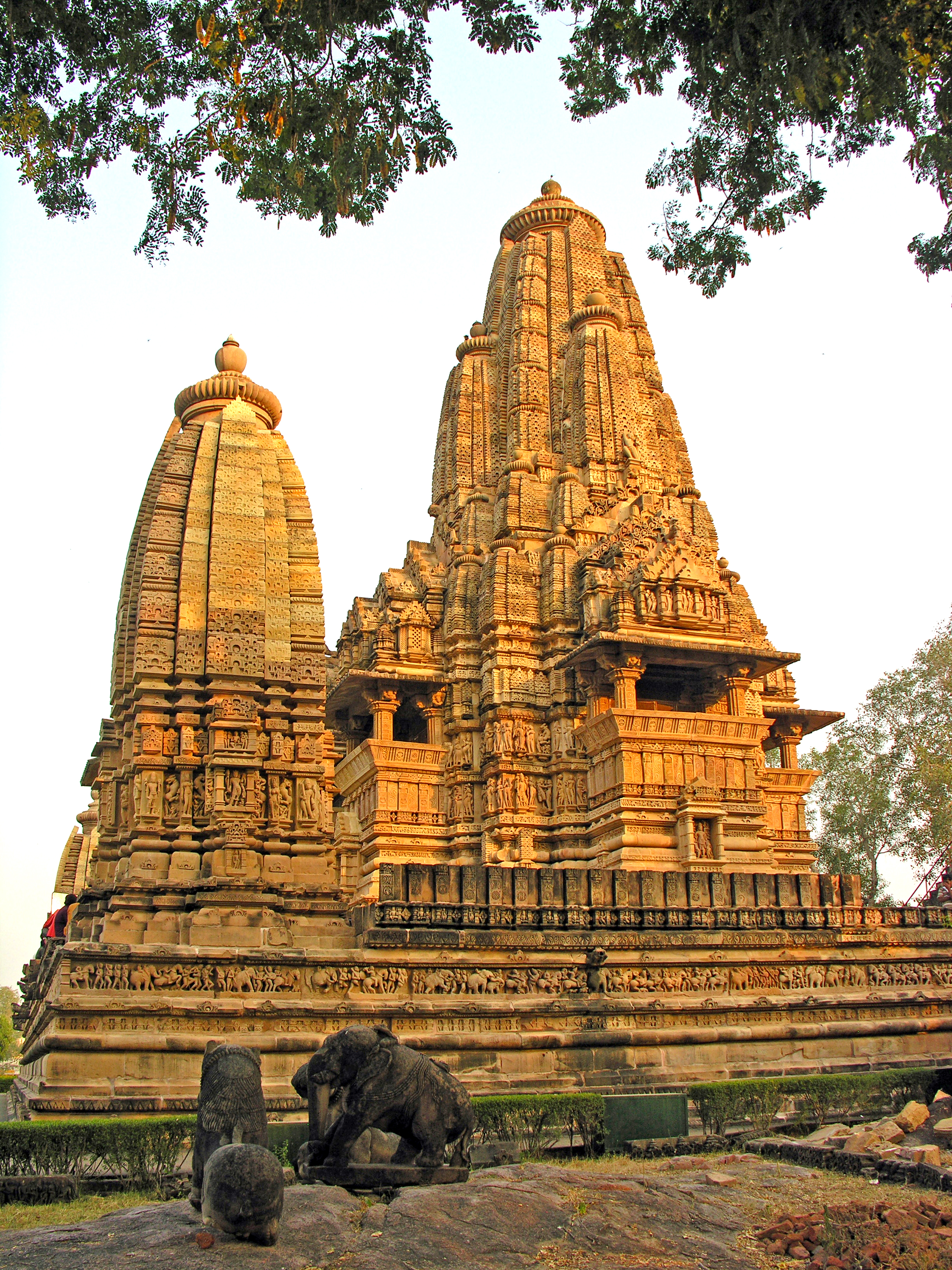
Lakshmana temple (back)

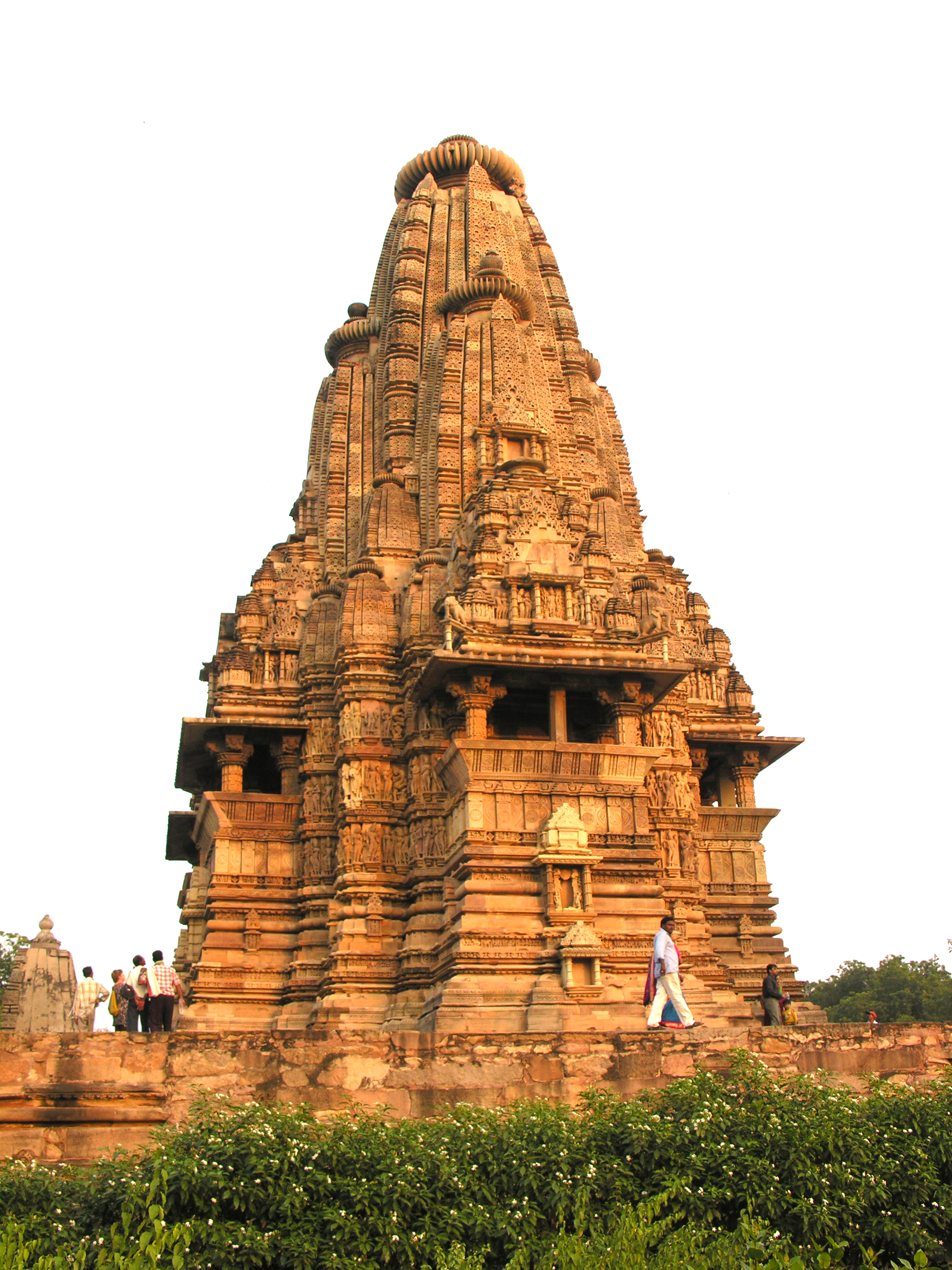
Vishvanatha Temple (back)

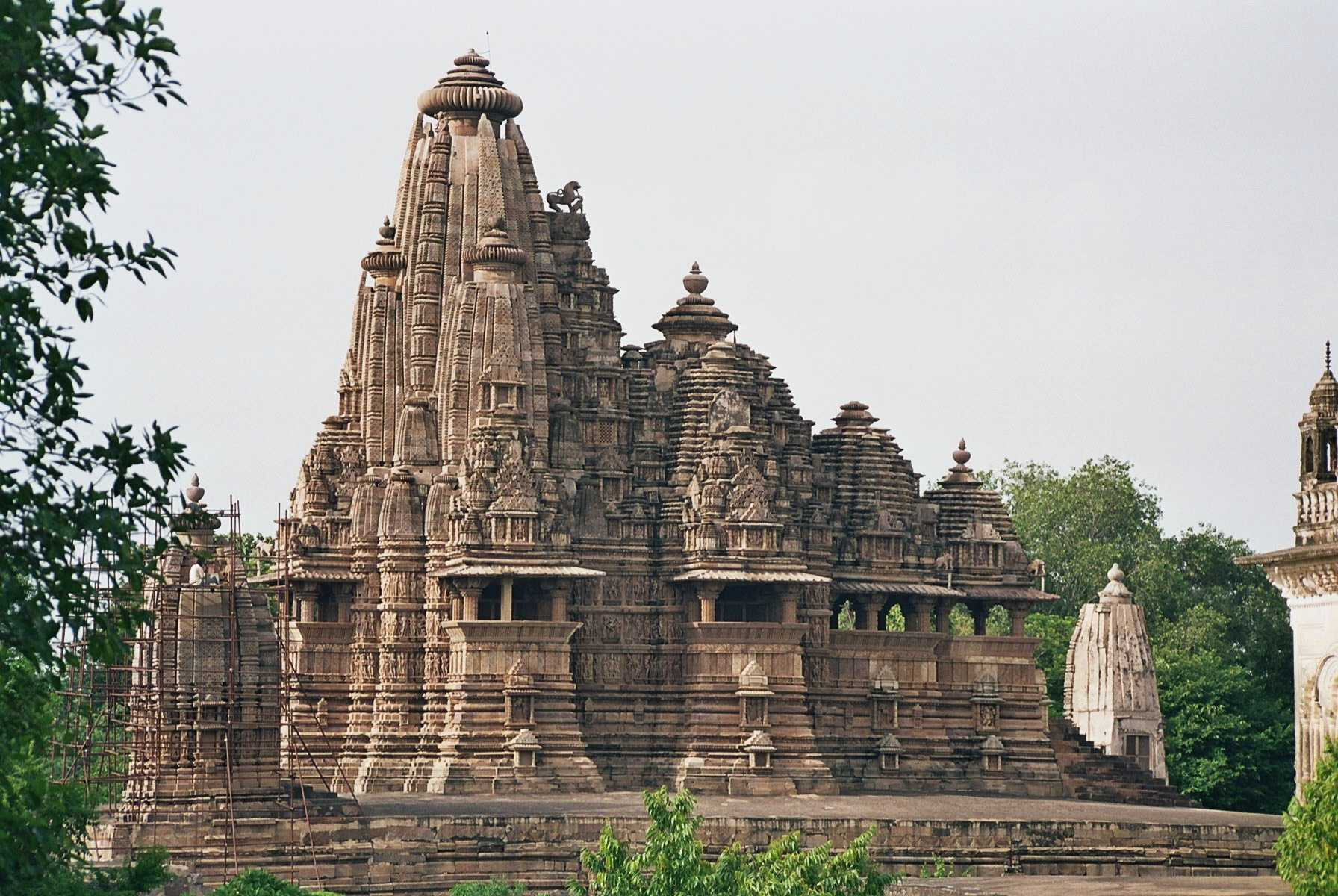
Vishvanatha Temple (side)

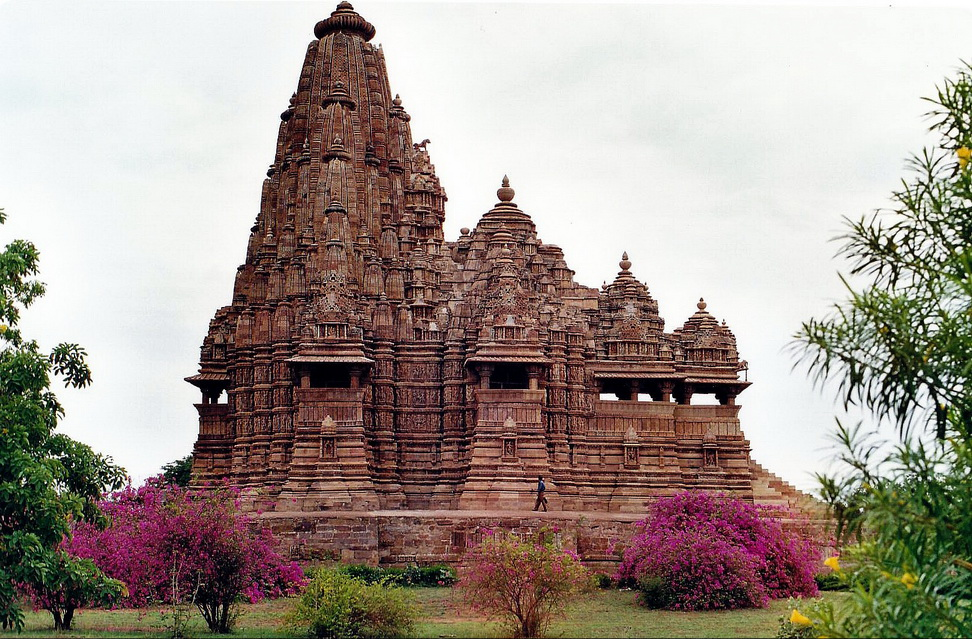
Kandariya Mahadeva Temple (side)

The Vishvanatha site was designed as a panchayatana complex, which comprises one main shrine surrounded by four smaller subsidiary shrines. However, only two of the smaller shrines now survive. The main shrine is oriented towards the east. Nandi Temple, the shrine to its east is dedicated to Shiva's mount Nandi, whose 2.2 m high statue faces the main shrine. The shrine in the south-west is dedicated to Shiva's consort Parvati. The Parvati temple is partially damaged, with only its sanctum (garbhagriha) and roof (shikhara) surviving. The sanctum houses an idol of Parvati standing on an iguana.

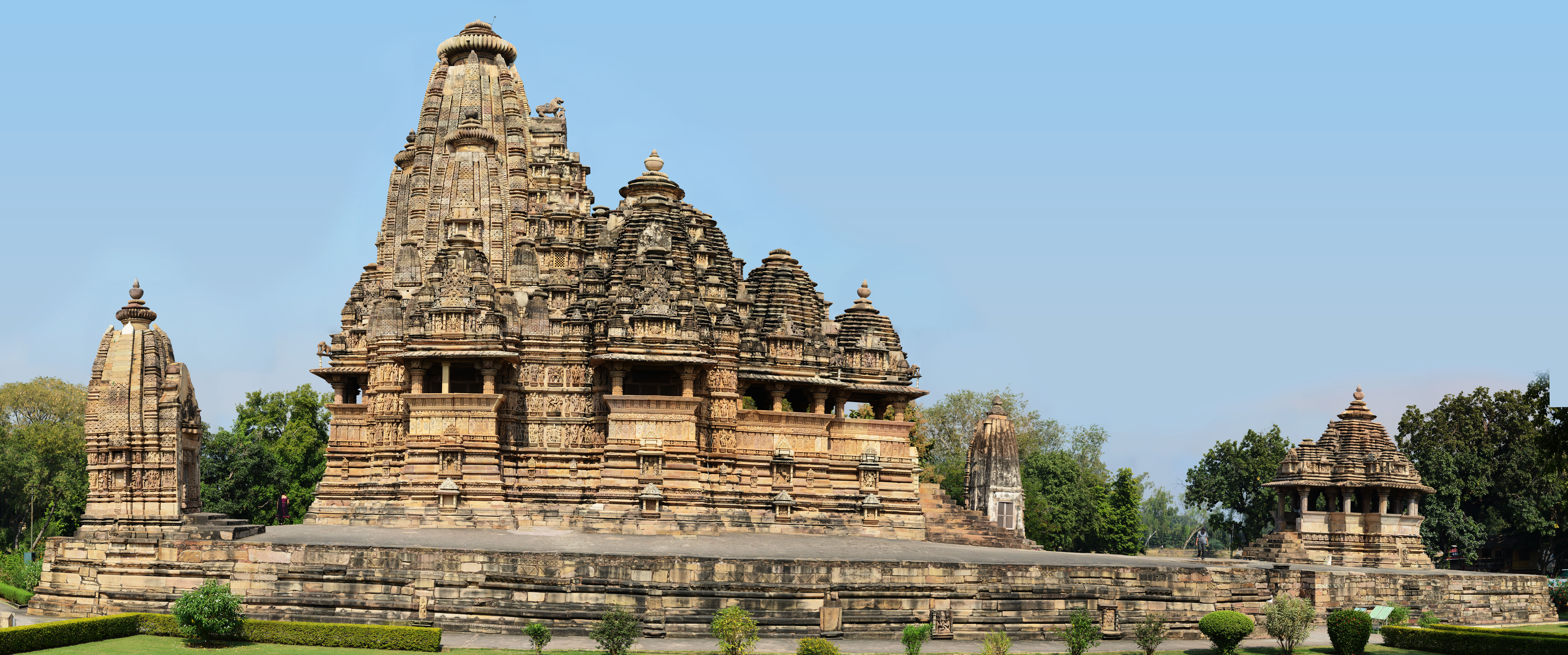
The main shrine with its two subsidiary shrines

The main shrine is an example of the nagara style: it contains an entrance porch (ardha-mandapa), a small hall (mandapa), a large hall (maha -mandapa), a vestibule (antarala), and a sanctum (garbhagriha) with a roof tower (shikhara). All these are located on a base with several sculptures. The stairs leading from the base to the porch are flanked by lions on one side, and elephants on the other side. The rectangular plan of the main shrine measures 27.5 metres (90 ft) x 13.7 metres (45 ft).

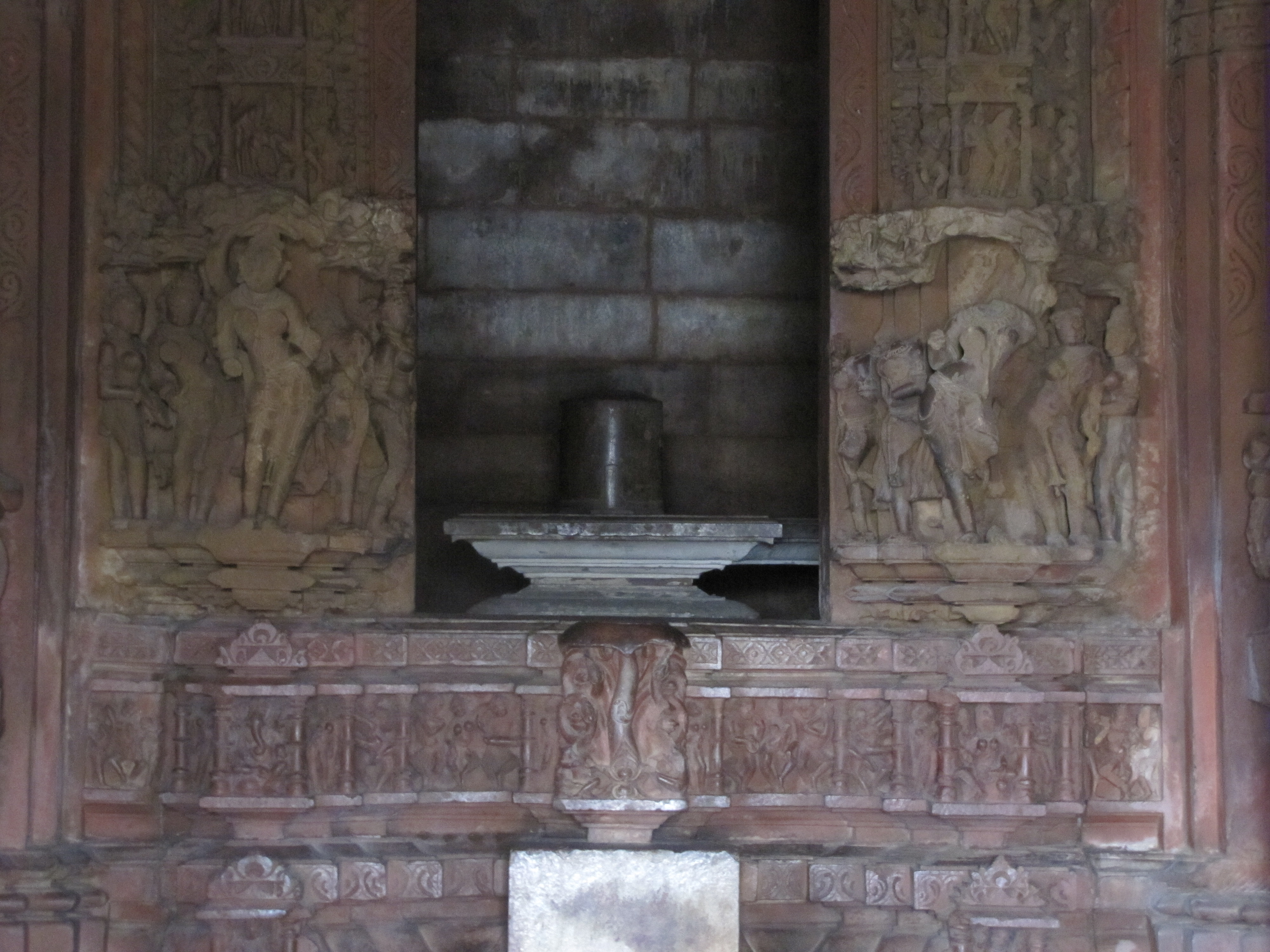
Vishvanatha Temple

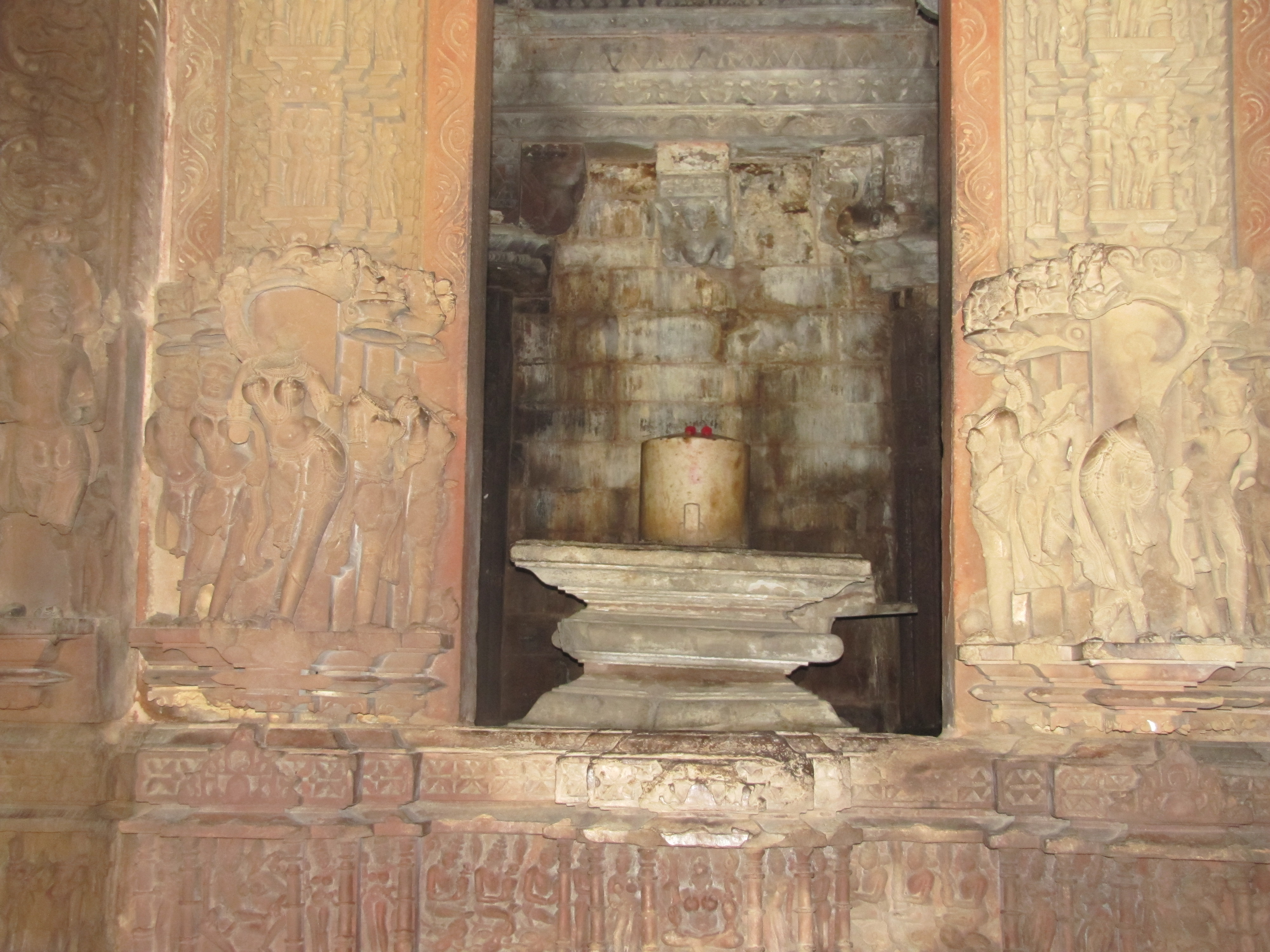
Kandariya Mahadeva Temple

Comparison of lingas in the sanctum

The sanctum has a stone linga; the emerald linga mentioned in the inscription is missing. The linga is surrounded by a passage for parikrama (circumambulation). The sanctum has balconies on three sides for light and ventilation.

Sandstone is the main building material used in the structure.

== Sculptures ==
The base of the temple has several niches with sculptures of the Saptamatrikas (seven goddesses), Shiva's consort Parvati and a dancing Ganesha.

Exterior reliefs

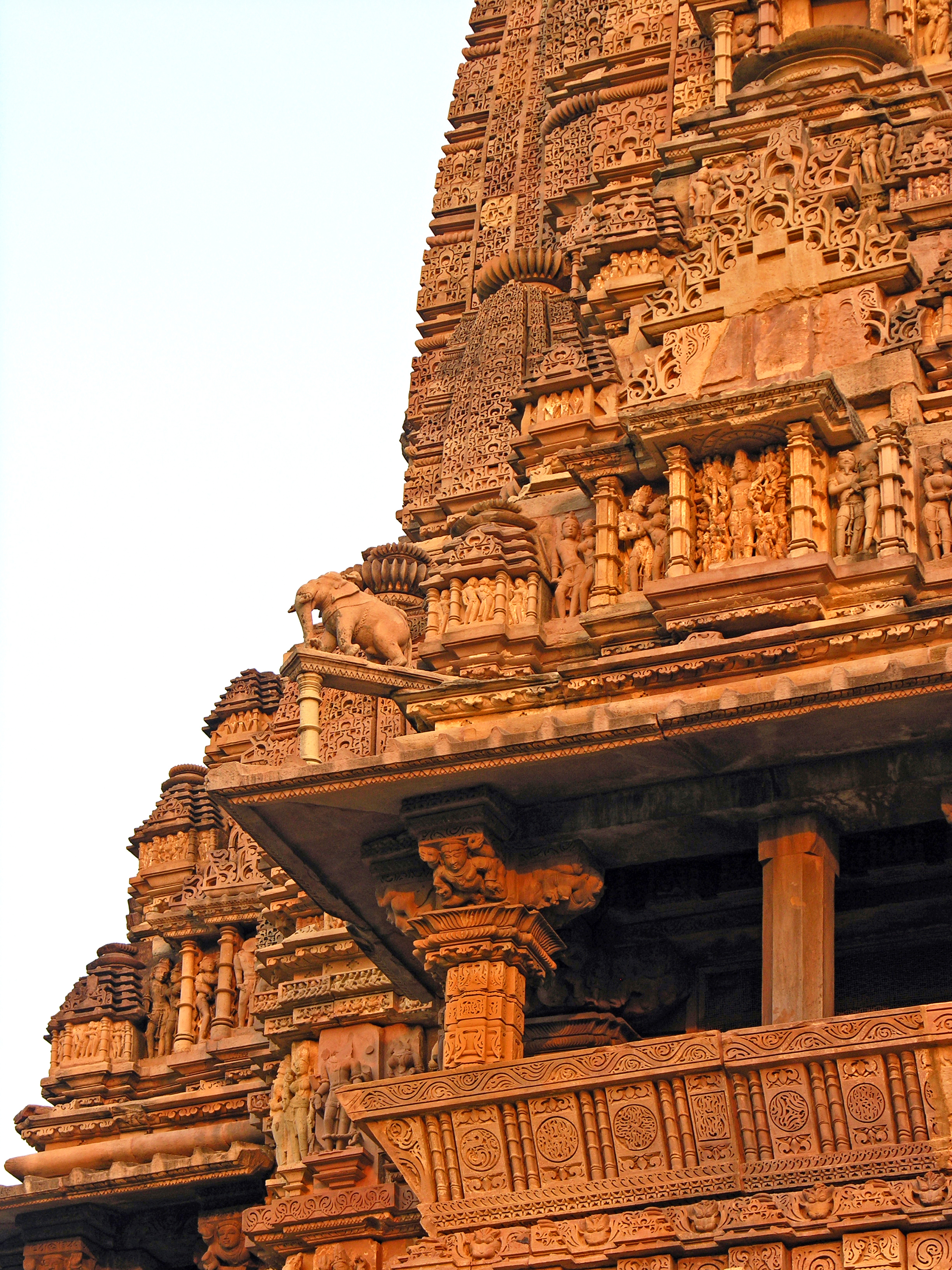

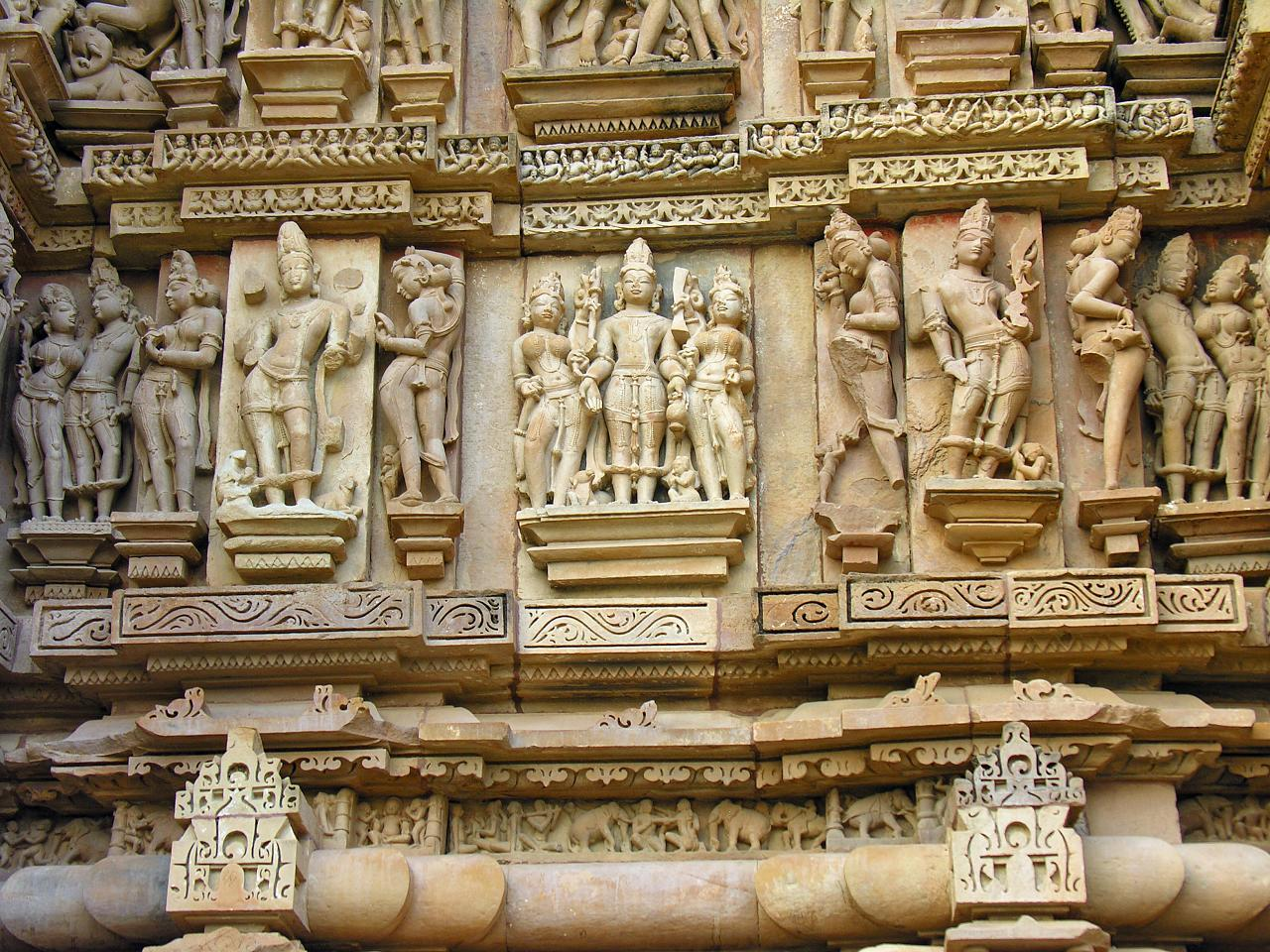

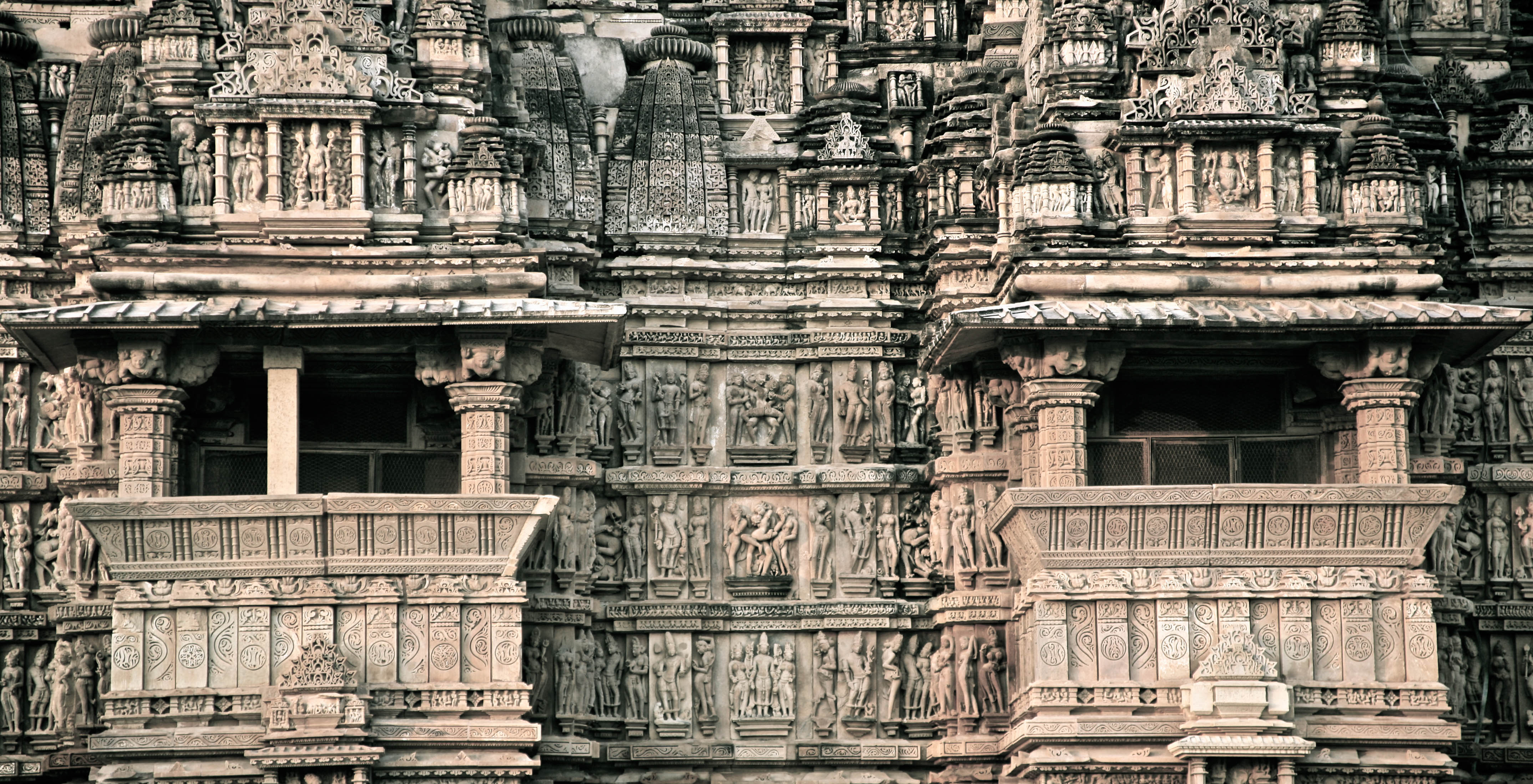

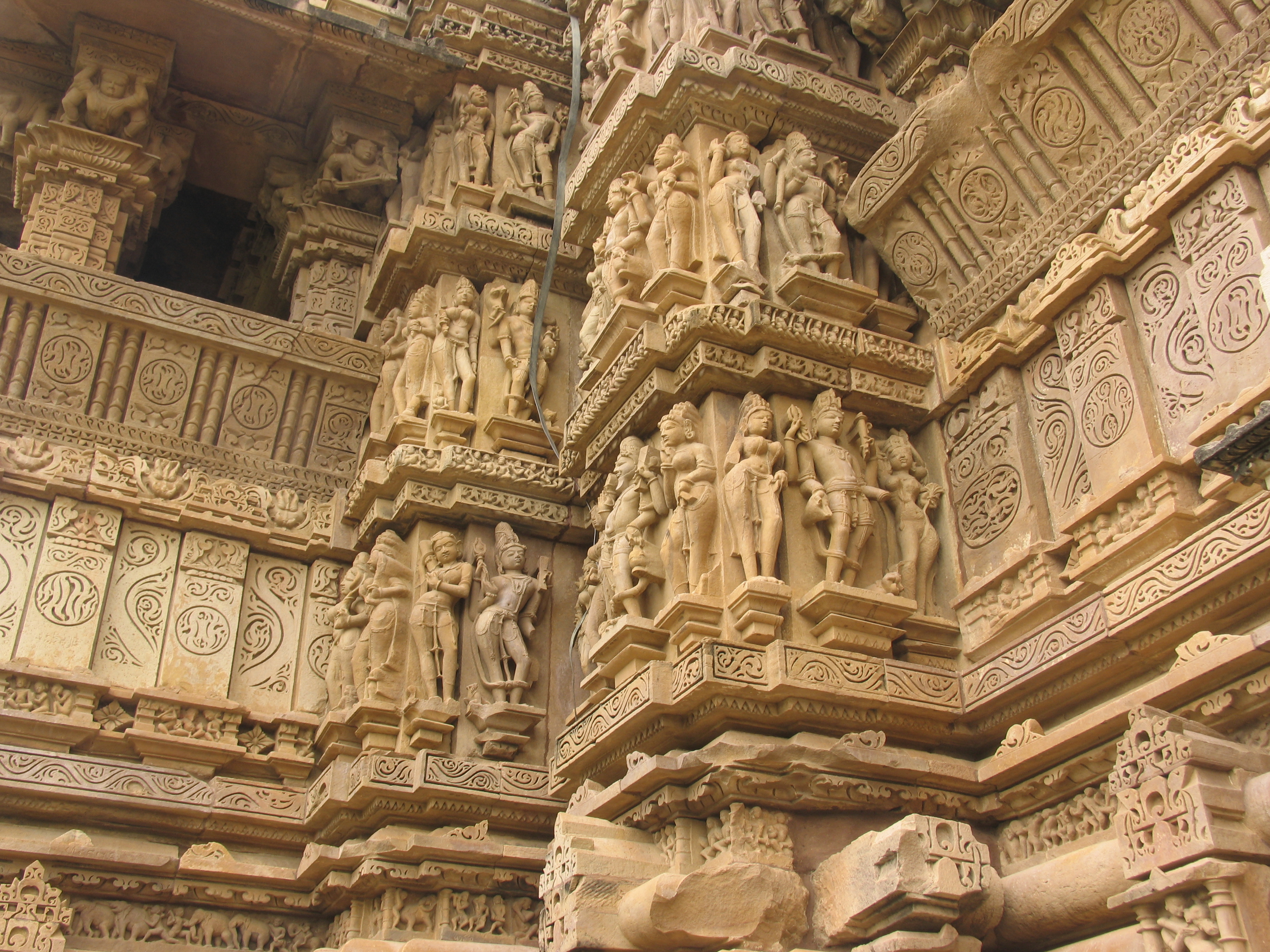

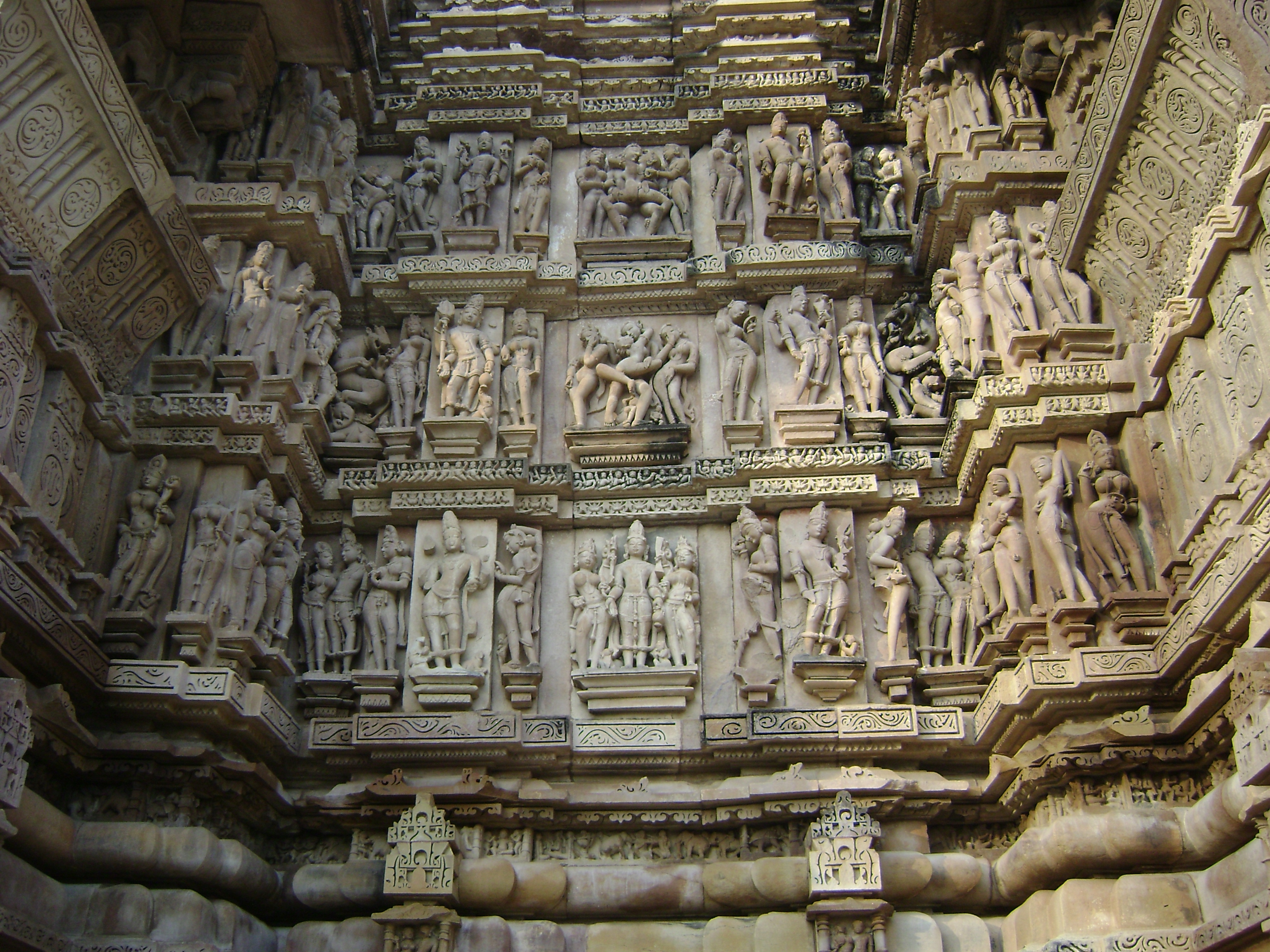
Sculptures

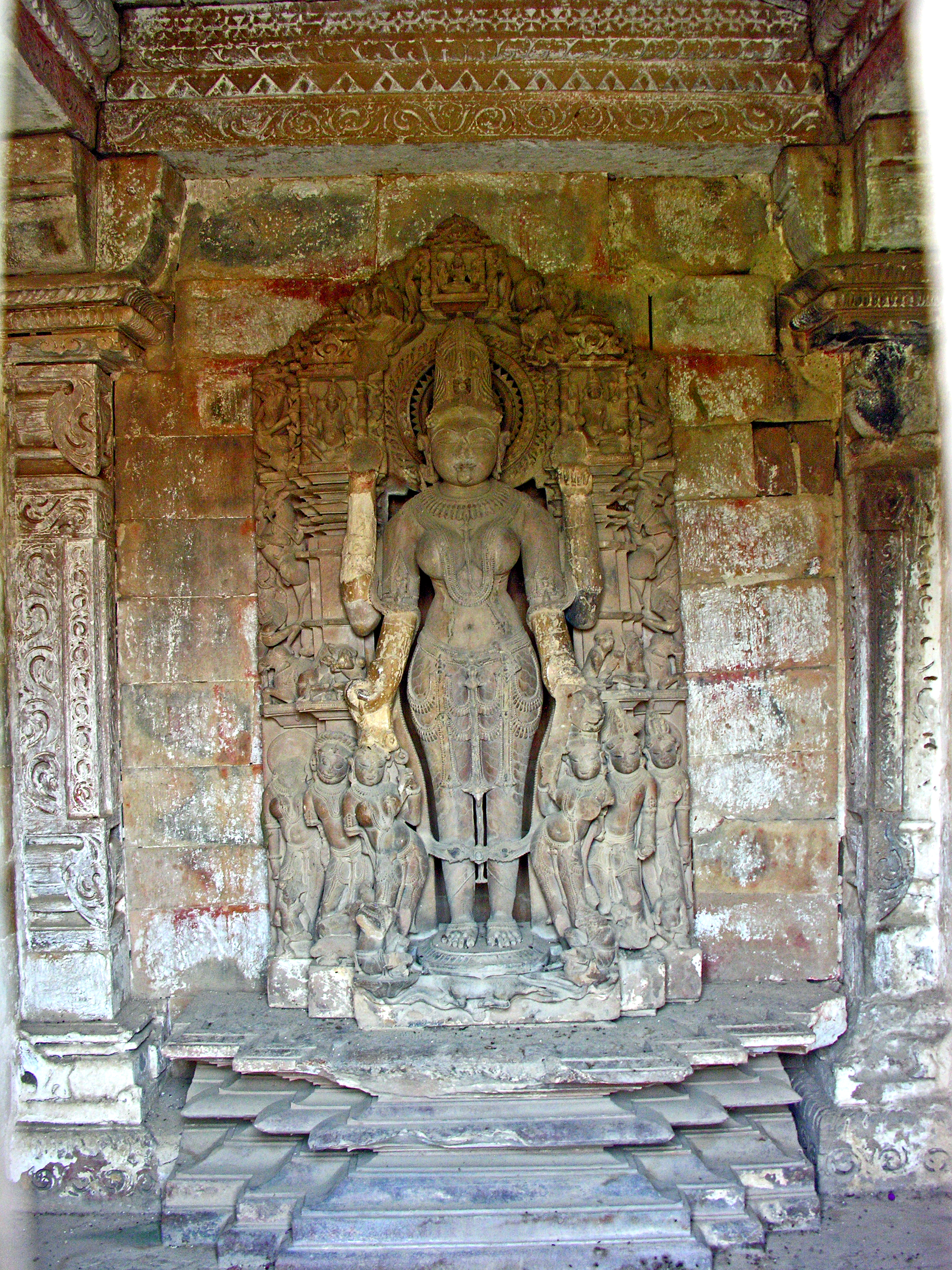
Parvati

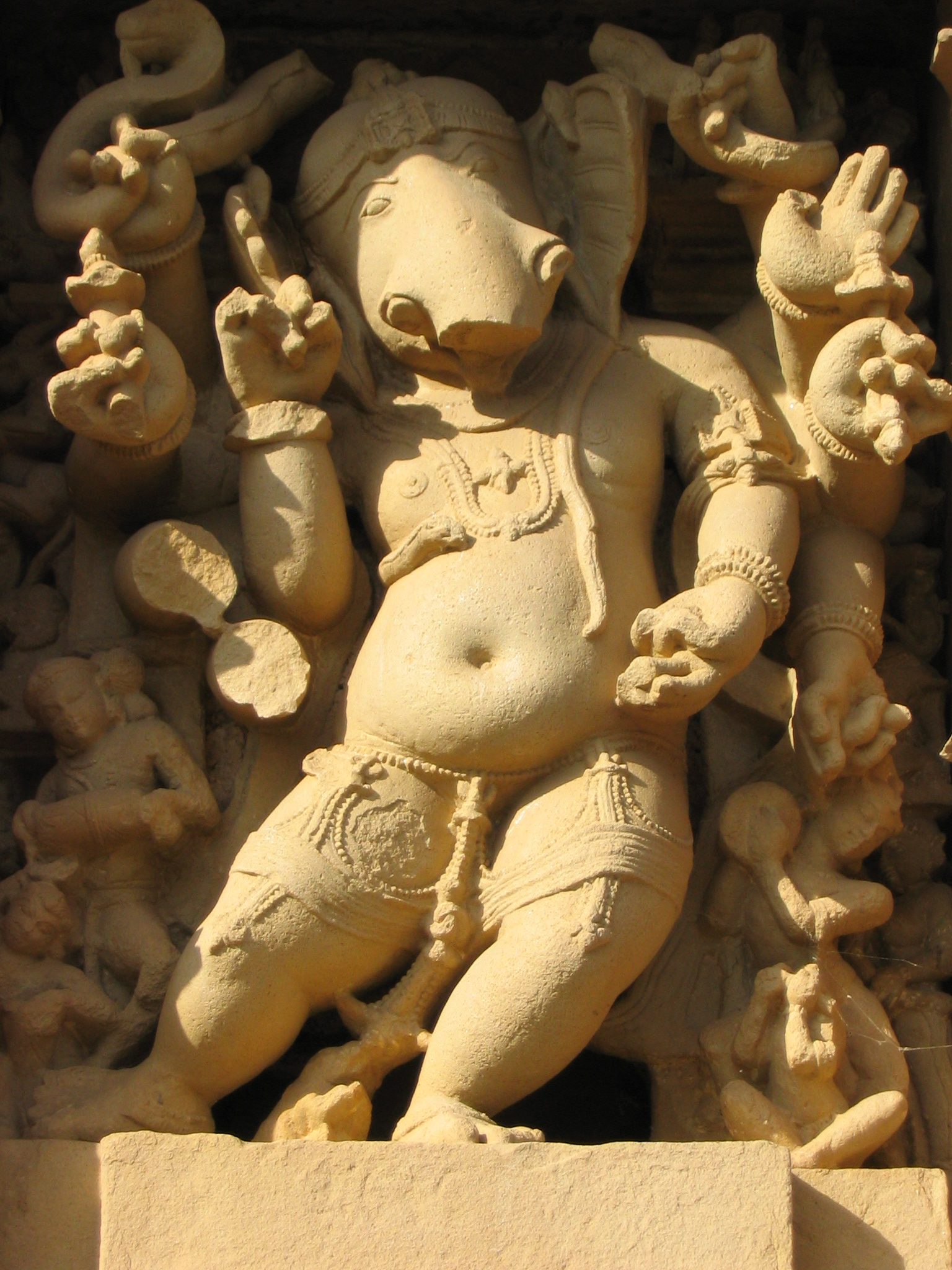
Dancing Ganesha

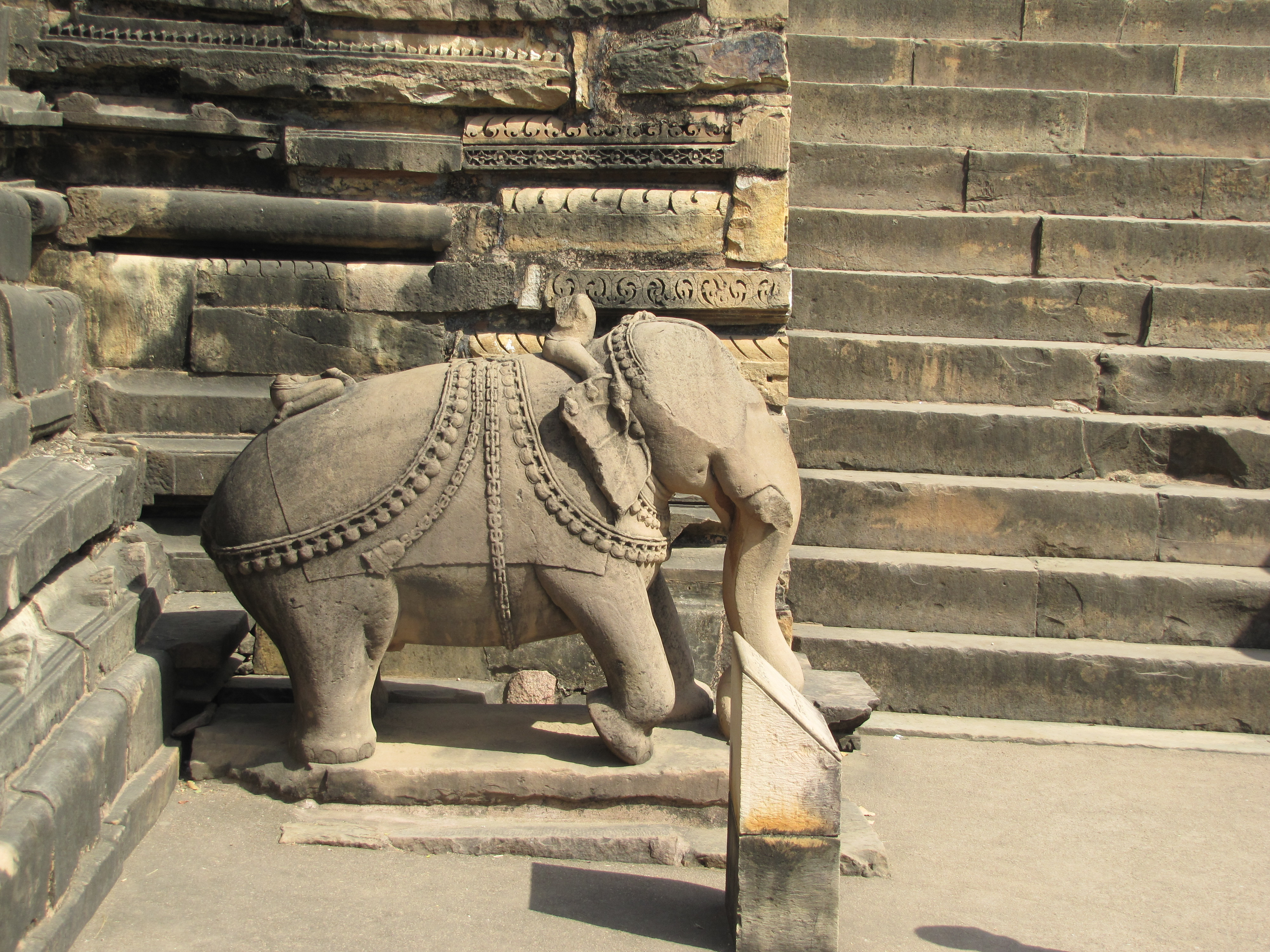
Elephant at the steps

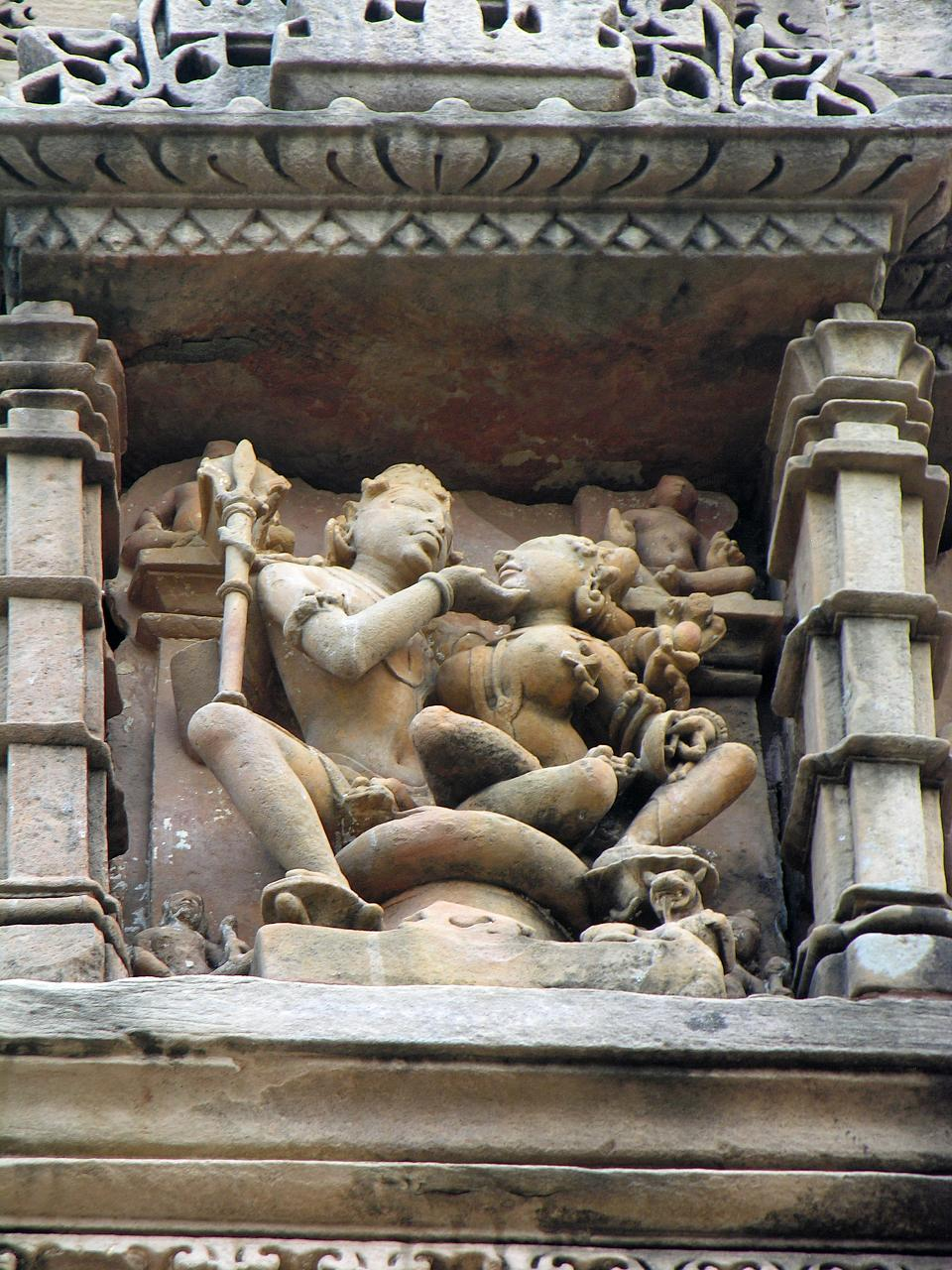
Loving couple

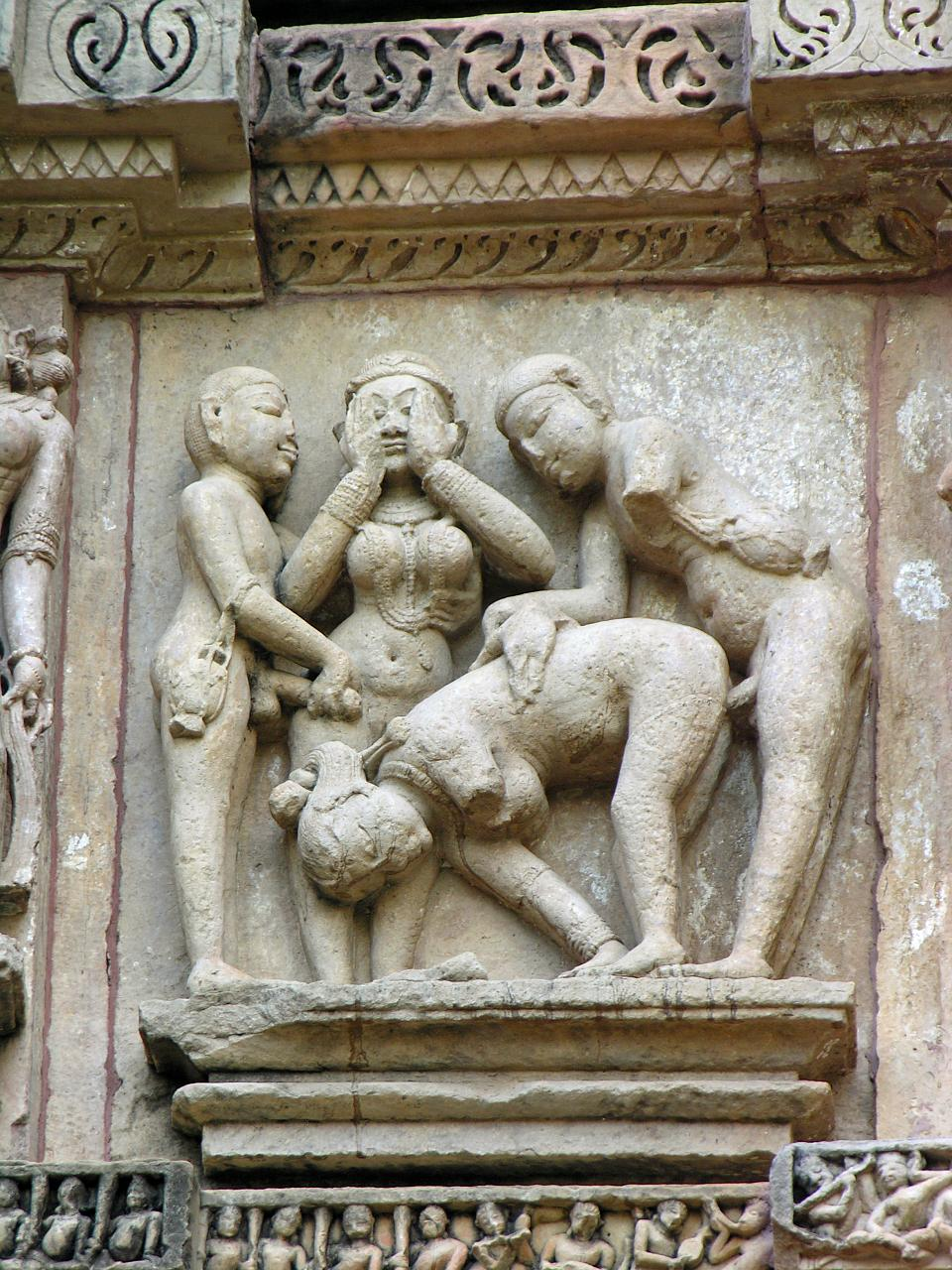
Erotic sculpture

The exterior portion above the base has three bands featuring sculptures of various deities, surasundaris (female figures) such as apsaras, and mythical creatures. The surasundaris are shown performing various day-to-day activities, such as applying sindoor (vermilion powder) to their foreheads and kohl to their eyes, wringing their hair after bathing, playing flute, plucking thorn from their feet, dancing, admiring themselves in a mirror, dressing or simply posing provocatively. Their hairstyles, patterned garments, ornaments and expressive faces are noticeable in these sculptures.

The parikrama passage in the sanctum features what Ali Javid and Tabassum Javeed call the "most striking carvings of females in Khajuraho". One figure shows a surasundari playing a flute, with her body slightly bent sideways, exhibiting the contemporary ideal of the female body. Another figure, which is partially damaged, shows a damsel in a dancing pose. One sculpture shows a mother holding her baby: she is slightly bending sideways to let her baby sit on her hip. Another one shows a female lifting her left foot behind her, and applying dye on it. Yet another one shows a maiden trying to tie her bra behind her back, as the twisted body accentuates her curves.

Surasundaris at Vishvanatha Temple

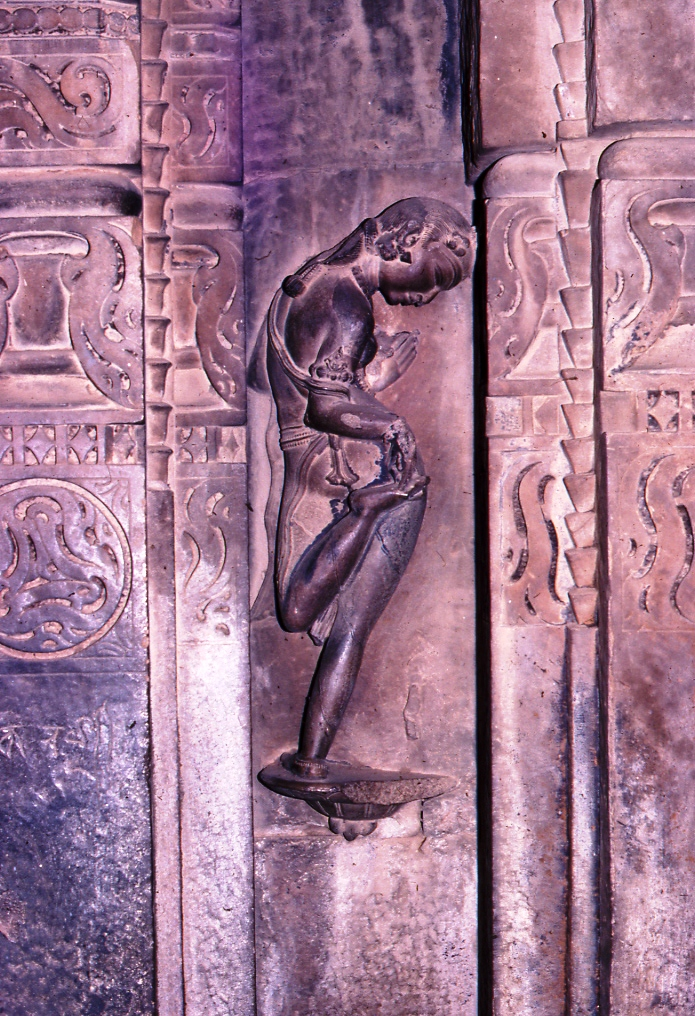
Plucking a thorn

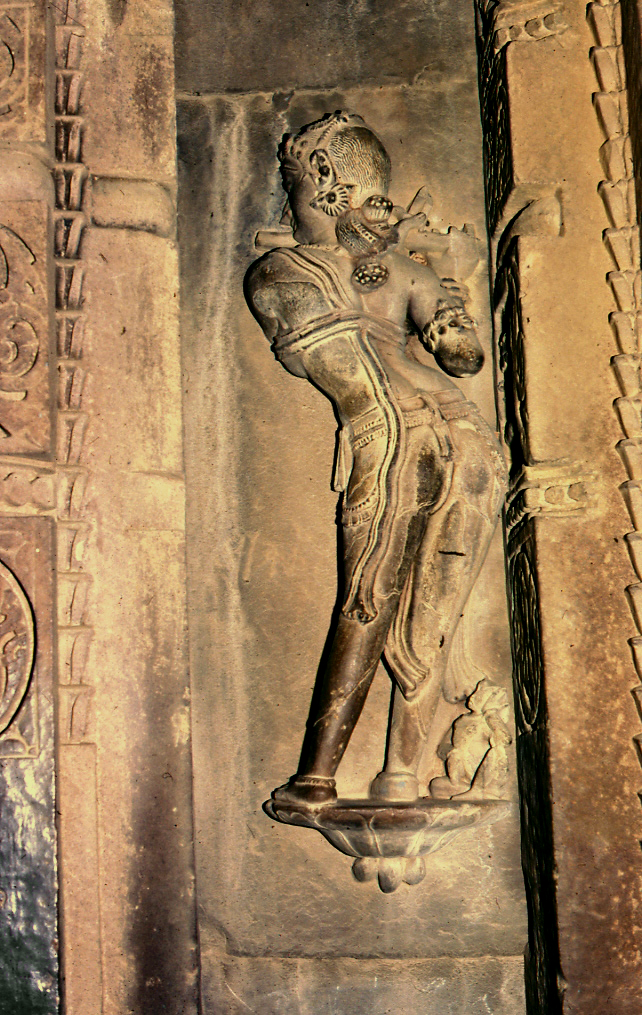
Playing flute in sanctum

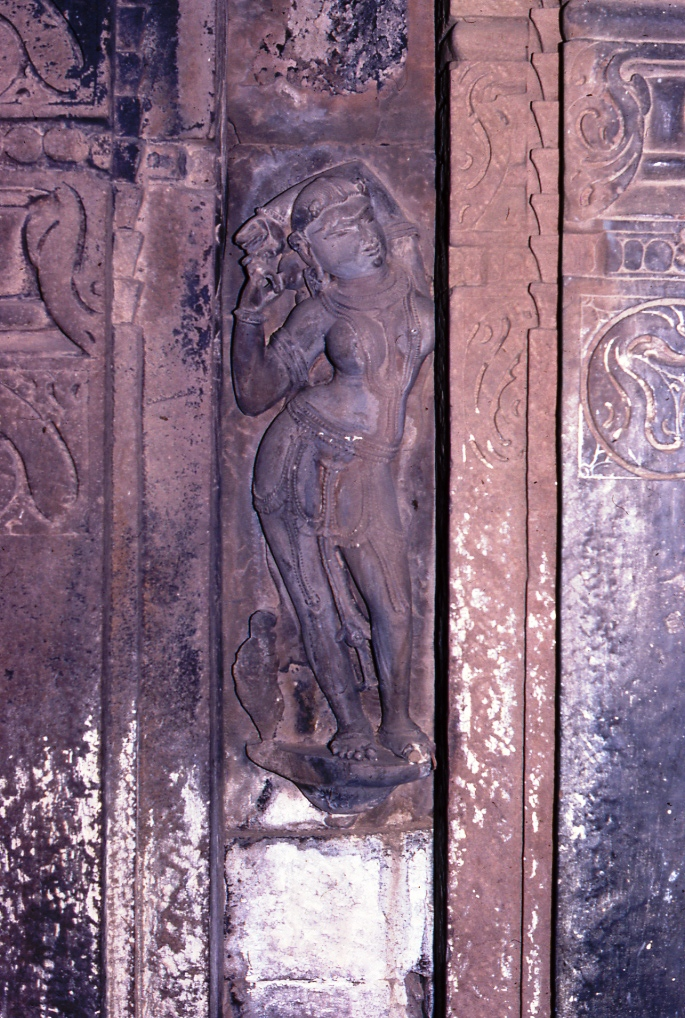
Fixing her hair

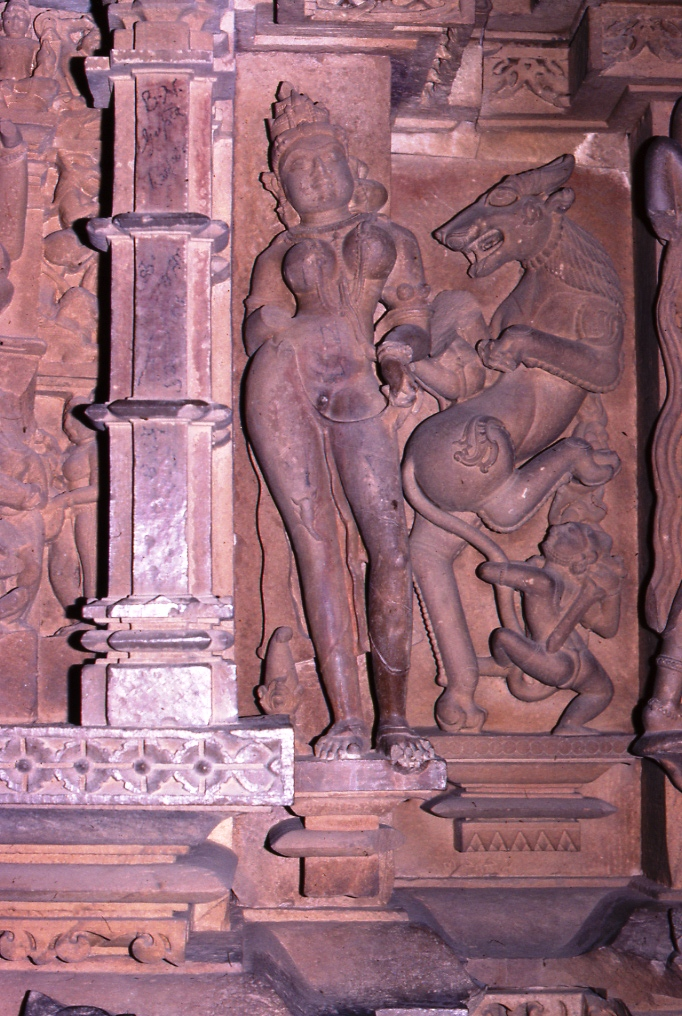
With vyala, a mythical beast

The north and south walls of the temple feature erotic reliefs. The junction of the vestibule and the sanctum features a variation of the famous "acrobatic sex" sculpture at the newer Kandariya Mahadeva temple. Like the Kandariya sculpture, this one also features a couple supported by two women, but in this sculpture, the man is on the top. The woman at the bottom fingers the woman on the left with one hand, while her other hand rests on the ground for support. Some sculptures feature men indulging in bestiality, as women cover their eyes.

Comparison of erotic sculptures

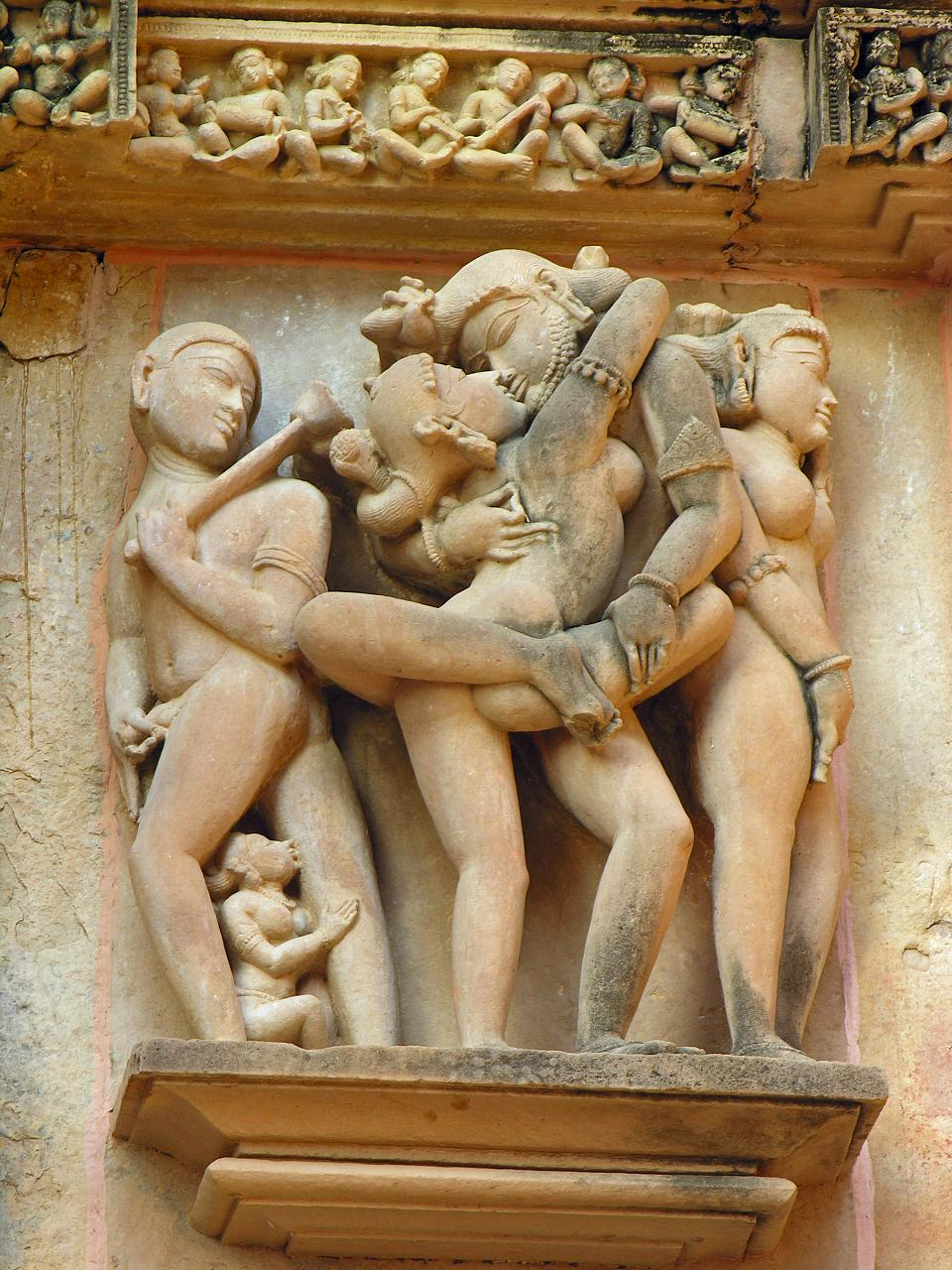
Embracing couple at the Lakshmana temple

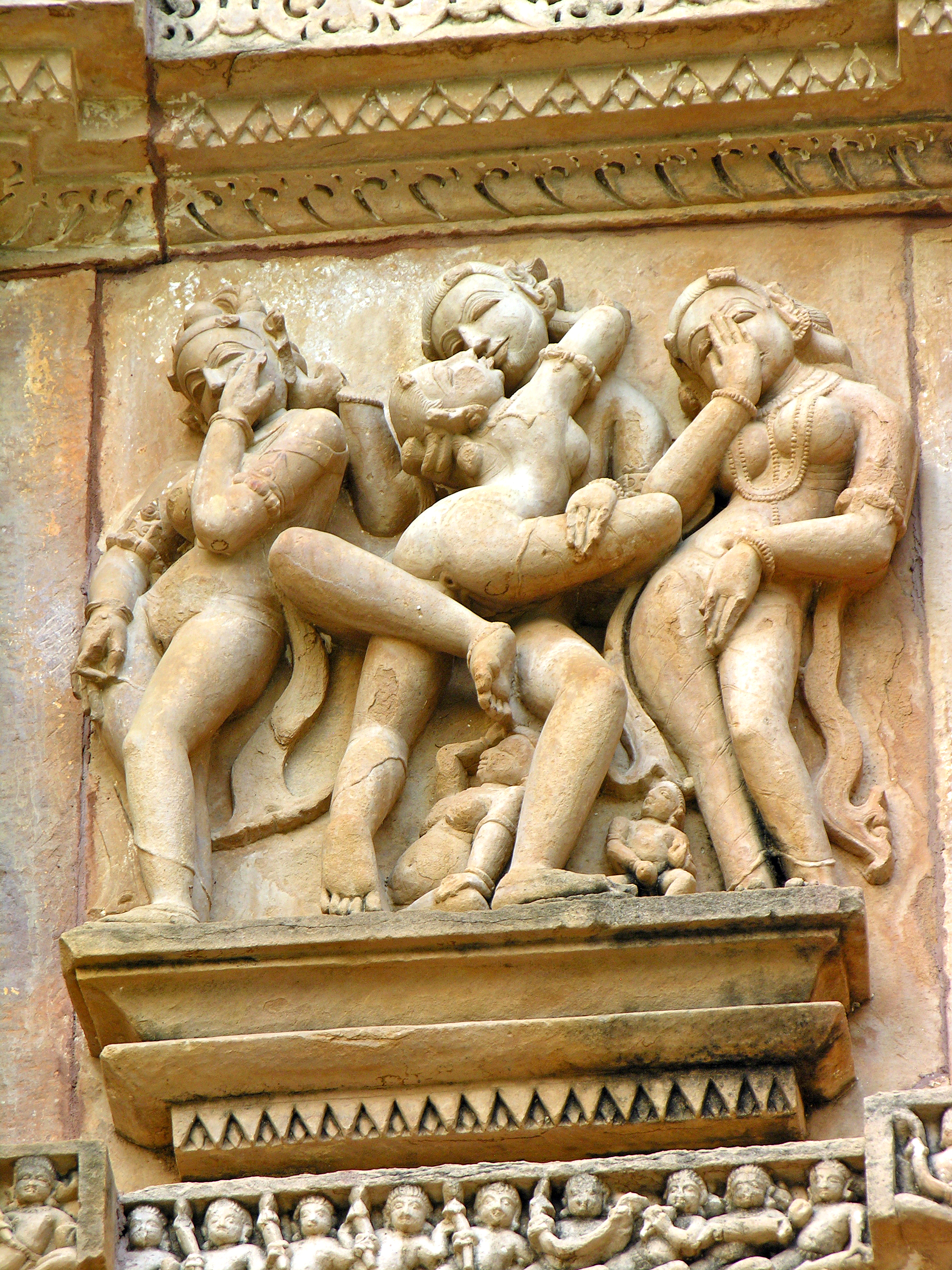
Embracing couple at the Vishvanatha Temple

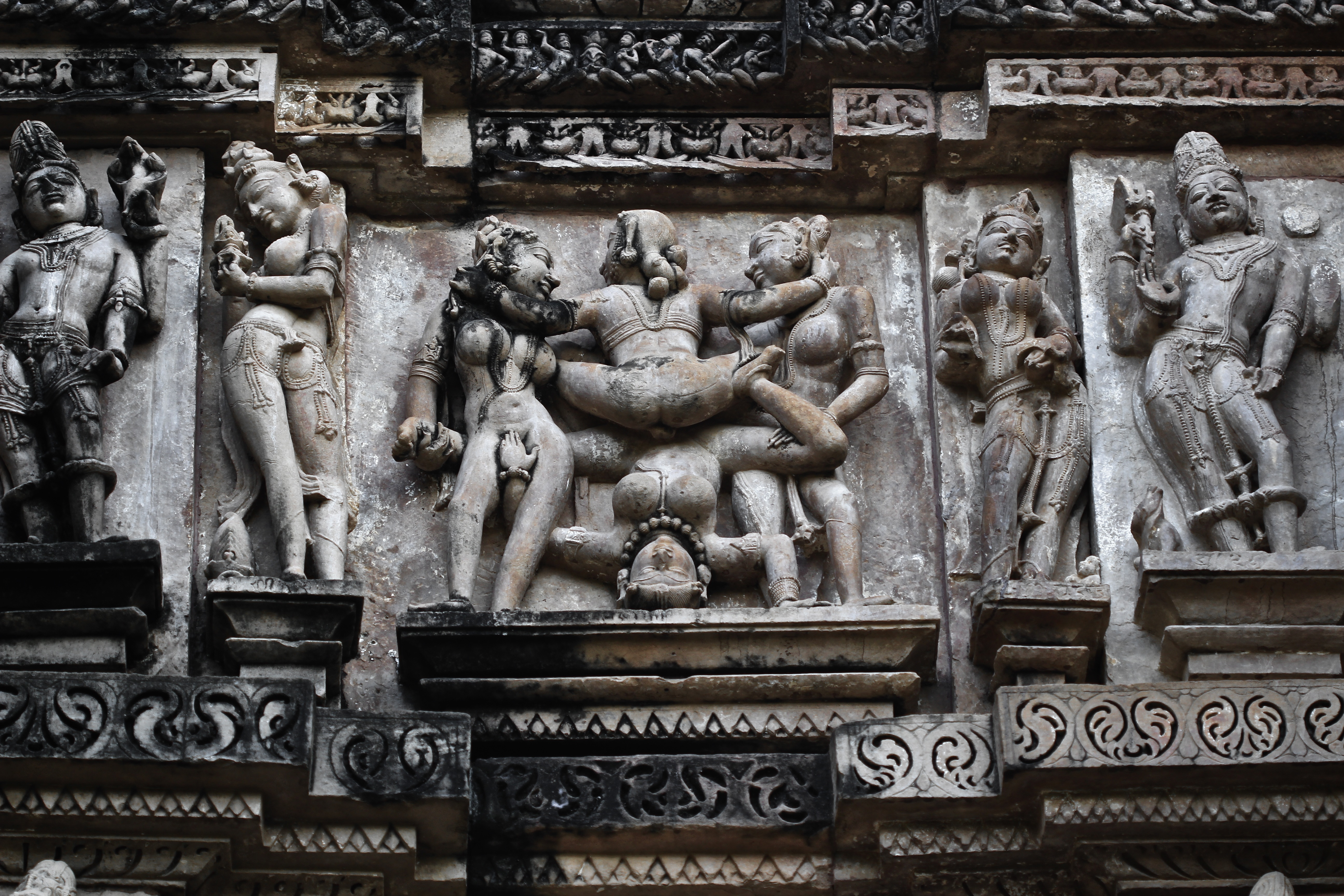
Acrobatic sex at Vishvanatha Temple: Man on top

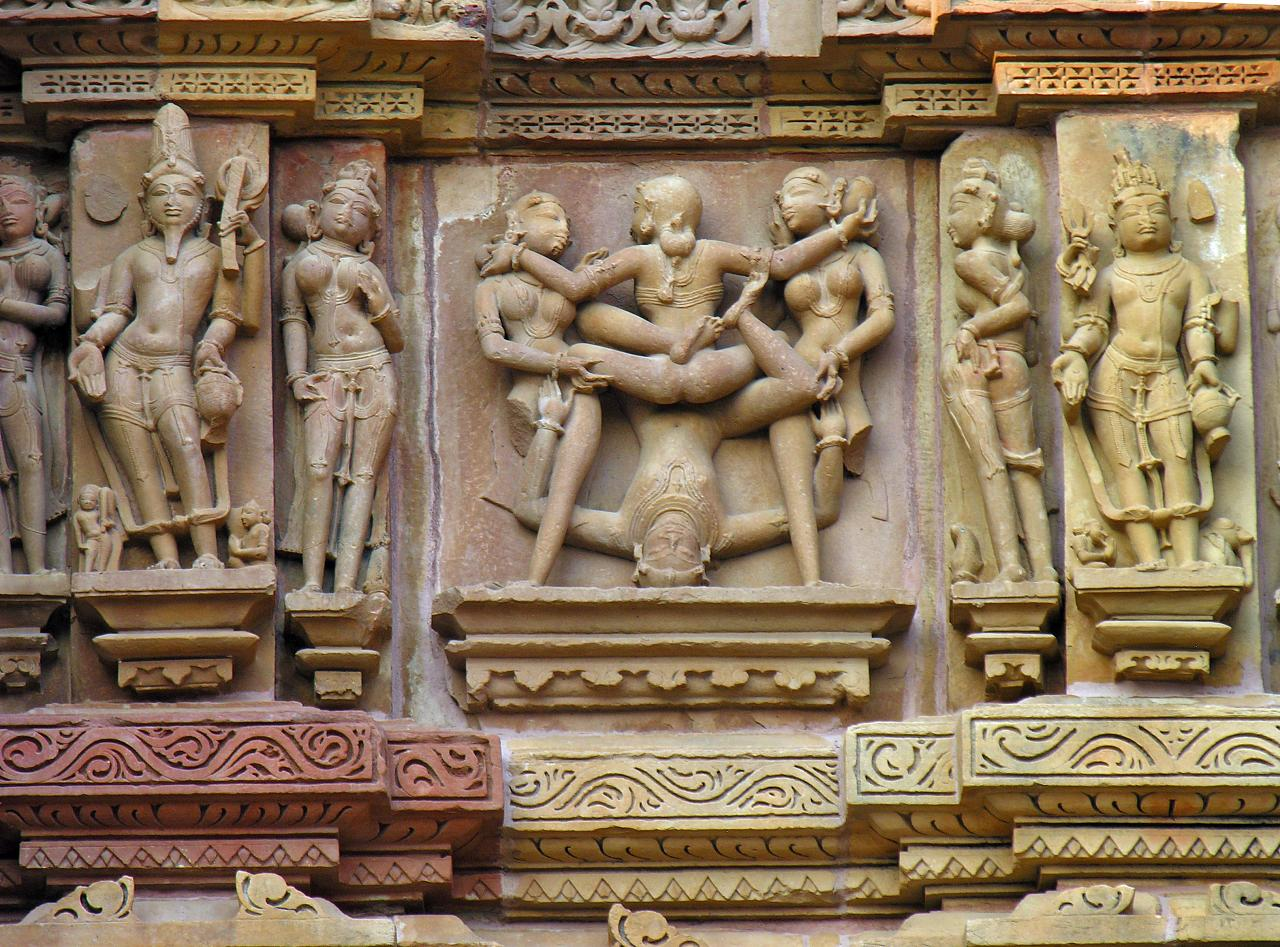
Acrobatic sex at Kandariya Mahadeva Temple: Woman on top

The interior features faceted pillars in all the rooms. The ceiling and the brackets supporting it are intricately carved. However, the bracket figures in the large hall are now badly worn.

=== Interpretations of erotic sculptures ===
Various interpretations of the erotic sculptures have been proposed. Colonial arts administrator Ernest B. Havell considered these as a product of a decadent phase in the Hindu society. A contrasting view is that these are Kamashastra-inspired artistic tradition of a broad-minded society.

Vidya Dehejia, a professor of South Asian Art at Columbia University, states that these sculptures depict the rites of the Kaula and Kapalika sects. These sects believed that only those who can resist the sensual temptations can achieve salvation. To realise whether one can rise above such temptations, one had to experience them while remaining unaffected. Thus, these sects provided a theological excuse for the over-indulgent Chandela rulers to engage in "the most debased practices".

According to the Indian art historian Devangana Desai, the erotic sculptures at Vishvanatha and Kandariya Mahadeva Temples served the following functions:

- These sculptures have a deeper, hidden meaning: they represent a "yogic-philosophic concept", using sandhya-bhasha (metaphorical code language). The tantrikas (tantra practitioners) used such language to avoid exposing their practices to the general public.
- These figures conceal a yantra used for worship.
- The figures of couples having sex (maithuna) are present at the juncture walls that connect the sanctum to the hall. These were believed to magically protect the monument at its most vulnerable part.
- The erotic sculptures can give pleasure to the non-initiated visitors to the temple.

Fred Kleiner, a professor of art and architecture at Columbia University, believes these sculptures symbolise "fertility and propagation of life and serve as auspicious protectors" of the sacred temple. Margaret Prosser Allen, a University of Delaware academic, mentions that the erotic sculptures depict the aim of human life: the union with the universal being. This depiction is based on the belief that the universe is a result of the "cosmic union of male and female elements".
