= Naandi =

Naandi may refer to:

- Naandi (film), 1964 Kannada-language film
- Naandri, Meendum Varuga, a Tamil language film
- Naandi language, a Kalenjin language of Kenya
- Naandhi, 2021 Telugu-language film

== See also ==
- Nandi (disambiguation)
