= Nandhi =

Nandhi may refer to:

- Nandi (mythology) or Nandhi, the white bull on which Lord Shiva rides
- Nandhi (2002 film), a Kannada film
- Nandhi (2011 film), a Tamil film

== See also ==
- Nandi (disambiguation)
