= Nandi Temple =

Nandi Temple may refer to:

- Basavanagudi Nandi Temple in Bangalore, India
- Nandi Temple, Khajuraho India
- Arunachaleswara Temple, Nandi, Karnataka, India
- Sri Dakshinamukha Nandi Tirtha Kalyani Kshetra
- Any other shrine dedicated to Nandi (bull)
