= Nāndi =

Nāndi is a Nizari Isma'ili ceremony during which food offered to the Imām-e Zamān is sold off at auction to people attending the Jamatkhana (the Ismaili place of worship). The money obtained through the sale of Nāndi is sent to the Imām by a group of people from the Ismaili community (Jama'at) given that responsibility. The people in charge of selling the food are volunteers from the Jama'at, they announce what is on the plate and members of the Jama'at put their hands up to buy it. The preparation of the food is done at home and it is brought to the Jamātkhāne, the Mukhi (Ismaili minister) mentions the food during a blessing and tells the congregation that it has been offered to the Imām and the benefits of it are for the whole Jamāt, the food is known as "Mehmāni." If no physical Mehmāni has been brought to the Jamātkhāna then a symbolic plate called the "Mehmāni plate" can be touched during the Du'a Karavi ceremony, this serves as a substitute for physical food.

The offering of Mehmāni and buying and selling of Nāndi are not mandatory on Isma'ilis, only Holy Du'a, Dasond and following the Farmāns of the Imām are mandatory. Nāndi is symbolic and supplementary. It is said that the early Muslims gifted Prophet Muhammad with food however he then distributed it to the poor. In the Ismaili mosques, Ismailis receive the food and donate money which is then used for charity.
