= Nandy =

Nandy may refer to:

- Nandy (surname)
- Nandy (singer) (born 1987), Tanzanian singer and songwriter
- Nandy, Seine-et-Marne, a commune in north-central France
- Nandy, a character from the TV series Cro
- Shanidar I or Nandy, Neanderthal skeleton found at Shanidar Cave

== See also ==
- Nandi (disambiguation)
