= Esmaili-ye Sofla =

Esmaili-ye Sofla or Esmaili Sofla (Persian: اسماعيلي سفلي) may refer to:

- Esmaili-ye Sofla, Ilam
- Esmaili-ye Sofla, Kerman
