= Nandiwanaparthy =

- Village
- Country: India
- State: Telangana

Languages
  - Official: Telugu
- Time zone: UTC+5:30 (IST)
- Vehicle registration: TS 08 X XXXX

Nandiwanaparthy or Nandi Wanaparthy is a village in Ranga Reddy district in Telangana, India. It falls under Yacharam mandal. This village has three old temples: a popular Nandi temple, the Siddeshwara Temple, and the Shiva's Temple. The last of the three is called by the name Sri Sri Onkareshwara Swamy and was constructed about 100 years ago with the blessings of saint Sri Sri Bramhananda Yogananda Purnananda Swamy, who used to appear in many places at a time and bless his disciples. He also used to go to "Bugruha" (Suranga) and bring whatever was needed to construct the temple.
