= Ismaili (surname) =

Isma'ilism is a branch or sub-sect of Shia Islam. The Ismailis get their name from their acceptance of Imam Ismaʻil ibn Jafar.

Ismaili (Arabic: اسماعيلي) is also a common surname or patronymic meaning coming from Ismail or Ishmael, the first son of Prophet Abraham. It may also be use as Al-Ismaili (Arabic: الإسماعيلي) with the Arabic definite article al- meaning "The Ismaili".

People with the surname include:

== Ismaili ==
- Abas Ismaili (born 1967), Iranian former cyclist
- Florijana Ismaili (1995–2019), Swiss footballer of Albanian origin
- Ismail Ismaili (born 1981), Macedonian footballer of ethnic Albanian origin
- Rashidah Ismaili, also known as Rashidah Ismaili AbuBakr (born 1941), Benin poet, fiction writer, essayist and playwright
- Shaban Ismaili (born 1989), Macedonian footballer

== Ismaily ==
- Ismaily (footballer), full name Ismaily Gonçalves dos Santos (born 1990), Brazilian footballer

== Al-Ismaili ==
- Hamyar Nasser Al-Ismaili (born 1953), Omani businessman, former footballer, football club president

== Al-Ismaily ==
- Salem Ben Nasser Al-Ismaily, Omani businessman

== See also ==
- Ismaili (disambiguation)
