= Nandi Hills =

Nandi Hills may refer to:

- Nandi Hills, Karnataka, India
- Nandi Hills, Kenya
