= Nandi Firozpur =

Coordinates: 29.878°N 77.566°E

Nandi Firozpur or Nandi Ferozepur is a village of Saharanpur district, Uttar Pradesh, India. It is approximately ten kilometers from Saharanpur.

== Religious sites ==
In this village, there are mostly temples and a big mosque.
