= Nandi language =

Nandi language may refer to:

- Naandi language of Kenya, a Nilotic language also known as Cemual
- One of the other Nandi languages
- Nande language of Tanzania, a Bantu language also known as Ndandi
