= Esmaili, Iran =

Esmaili اسماعيلي
- Village
- Location within Iran
- Coordinates: 29°55′47″N 56°03′43″E
- Country: Iran
- Province: Kerman
- County: Bardsir
- Bakhsh: Central
- Rural District: Kuh Panj

Population (2006)
  - Total: 50
- Time zone: UTC+3:30 (IRST)
  - Summer (DST): UTC+4:30 (IRDT)

Esmaili (Persian: اسماعيلي, also Romanized as Esmā‘īlī) is a village in Kuh Panj Rural District, in the Central District of Bardsir County, Kerman Province, Iran. At the 2006 census, its population was 50, in 12 families.
