= Ismaili railway station =

Railway station in Chagai District, Pakistan

Ismaili railway station اسماعیلی ریلوے اسٹیشن

General information
- Coordinates: 28.778444°N 63.999781°E
- Owner: Ministry of Railways

Other information
- Station code: IMI
Location

Ismaili railway station (Urdu: اسماعیلی ریلوے اسٹیشن) is located in Pakistan.

== See also ==
- List of railway stations in Pakistan
- Pakistan Railways
