= Habiballah Esmaili =

Iranian historian

Habiballah Esmaili (حبیب اله اسماعیلی) is an Iranian historian who was the chief editor of the (now defunct) History Book of the Month History and Geography journal.
