= Esmaili Olya, Kerman =

Village in Kerman, Iran

Esmaili Olya اسماعيلي عليا
- Village
- Location within Iran
- Coordinates: 28°17′05″N 57°33′18″E
- Country: Iran
- Province: Kerman
- County: Anbarabad
- Bakhsh: Esmaili
- Rural District: Esmaili

Population (2006)
  - Total: 209
- Time zone: UTC+3:30 (IRST)
  - Summer (DST): UTC+4:30 (IRDT)

Esmaili Olya (Persian: اسماعيلي عليا, also Romanized as Esma‘ili ‘Olya; also known as Esmā‘īlī Bālā, Esmā‘īlī-ye Bālā, and Esmā‘īlīyeh-ye ‘Olyā) is a village in Esmaili Rural District, Esmaili District, Anbarabad County, Kerman Province, Iran. At the 2006 census, its population was 209, in 37 families.
