= Esmaili-ye Olya, Ilam =

Esmaili-ye Olya اسماعيلي عليا
- Village
- Location within Iran
- Coordinates: 33°51′28″N 46°16′27″E
- Country: Iran
- Province: Ilam
- County: Eyvan
- Bakhsh: Central
- Rural District: Nabovat

Population (2006)
  - Total: 110
- Time zone: UTC+3:30 (IRST)
  - Summer (DST): UTC+4:30 (IRDT)

Esmaili-ye Olya (Persian: اسماعيلي عليا, also Romanized as Esmā‘īlī-ye ‘Olyā) is a village in Nabovat Rural District, in the Central District of Eyvan County, Ilam Province, Iran. At the 2006 census, its population was 110, in 19 families. The village is populated by Kurds.
