= Du'a karavi =

Du‘ā' Karāwī is a religious ceremony in Nizari Isma'ilism during which the Isma'ili ask god for forgiveness through their Murshid, or, "Imam of the Time".

The Qur'an states that the Muslims must repent of their sins; it further stipulates that a believer (mu'min) must approach the presence of Muhammad and seek forgiveness, and that the Muhammad must also seek forgiveness on their behalf. This is expressed in several Qur'anic verses, including the following:

We sent not a Messenger, but to be obeyed, in accordance with the will of Allah. If they had only, when they were unjust to their souls, come unto you [Muhammad] and asked God’s forgiveness, and the Messenger had asked forgiveness for them, they would have found Allah indeed Oft-returning, Most Merciful. - Quran 4:64
