= Holy Du'a =

Nizari Isma'ili prayer

Holy Du'ā (archaically transliterated Doowa) is the mandatory Nizari Isma'ili prayer recited three times a day: Fajr prayer at dawn, Maghrib prayer at sundown and Isha prayer in the evening. Each Holy Du'a consists of 6 rakat, totaling 18 per day, as opposed to the 17 of Sunni and Twelver salat (namaz).

Only Nizaris are permitted to enter the prayer house, the Jama'at Khana, during the recitation the Holy Du'a; however, prayers can be performed at home or other places.

== Nizārī prayer performed at Jama'at Khana ==
Jama'at Khanas are usually built with a qibla facing Mecca although Ismāʿīlīs emphasize the belief that "to God belongs the East and the West" (Quran 2:142).

The Holy Du'a starts with Surah al-Fatiha and then various verses from Surat an-Nisa, al-Ma'ida, al-Fath and al-Anfal are recited and the last part of the rak'ah contains Surah al-Ikhlas. The du'a is performed sitting, with a prostration at the end of each rakah. In Khoja tradition, Ubhi Tasbih is recited during tahajjud. Tasbih (prayer beads) are used at various points during the du'a. Towards the end of the Du'a, a list of all the Imāms is read, beginning with Ali and ending with the current Imam. At the end of the du'a, worshippers turn to their neighbour, saying shah-jo deedar, "may you be blessed with the vision of your Lord". A major difference from other forms of Islamic prayer is that any Ismāʿīlī of any age may lead the ceremony, emphasising the equality of the sexes in Nizārī Ismailism.

The Holy Du'a is recited in Arabic, but it was once common for, Nizaris from India and Pakistan to recite the prayer in the vernacular.

== See also ==
- History of Nizari Ismailism
