= Esmaili-ye Sofla, Ilam =

Village in Ilam, Iran

Esmaili-ye Sofla اسماعيلي سفلي
- Village
- Location within Iran
- Coordinates: 33°51′51″N 46°15′59″E
- Country: Iran
- Province: Ilam
- County: Eyvan
- Bakhsh: Central
- Rural District: Nabovat

Population (2006)
  - Total: 136
- Time zone: UTC+3:30 (IRST)
  - Summer (DST): UTC+4:30 (IRDT)

Esmaili-ye Sofla (Persian: اسماعيلي سفلي, also Romanized as Esmā‘īlī-ye Soflá; also known as Jūb-e Shahr Esma‘īl) is a village in Nabovat Rural District, in the Central District of Eyvan County, Ilam Province, Iran. At the 2006 census, its population was 136, in 25 families. The village is populated by Kurds.
