= Nandi Temple, Khajuraho India =

Nandi Temple
- नन्दी मंदिर
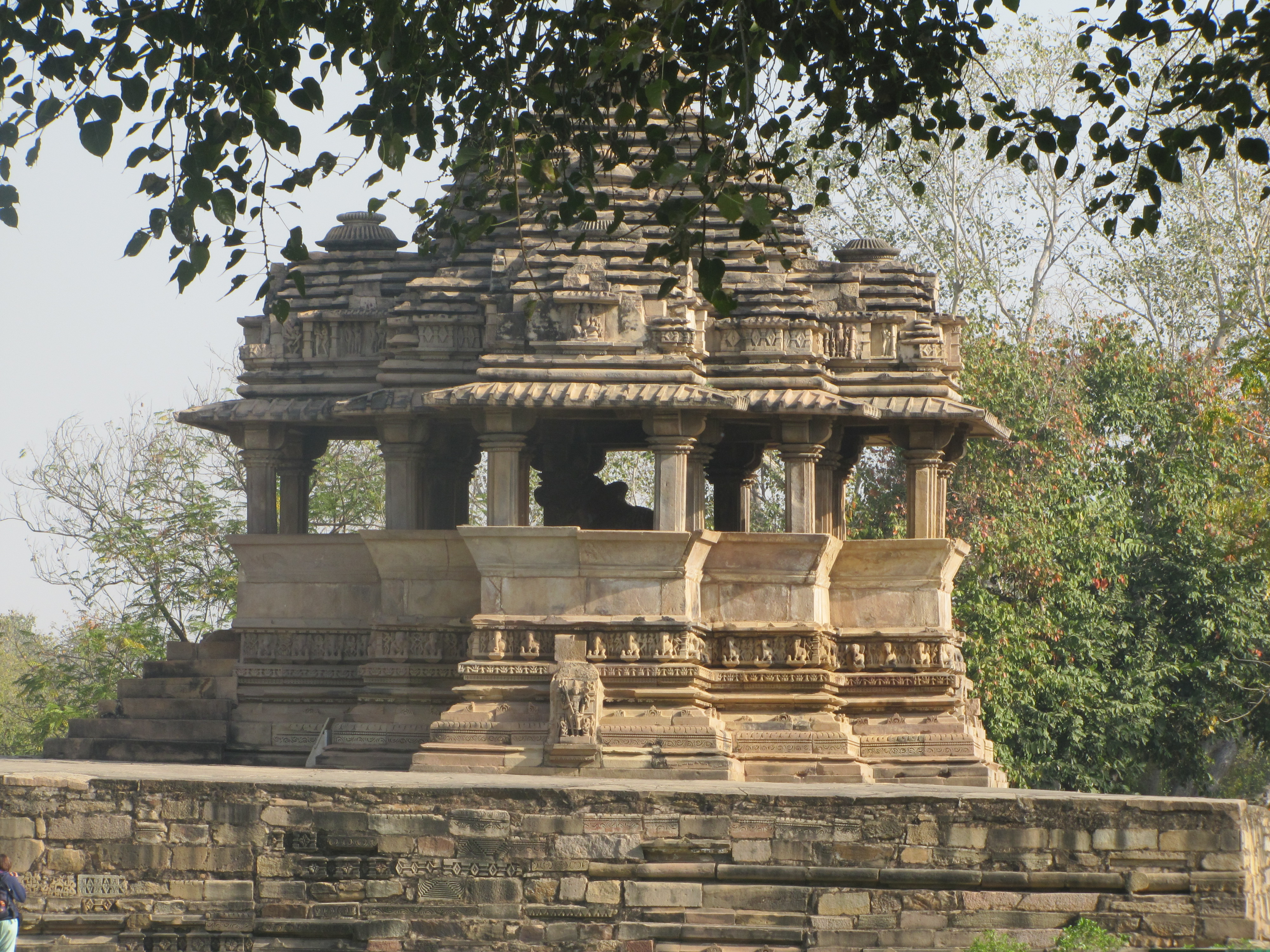
- Nandi Temple at Khajuraho

- Location in Madhya Pradesh

Religion
- Affiliation: Hinduism
- District: Chhatarpur, Khajuraho
- Deity: Nandi

Location
- Location: Khajuraho
- State: Madhya Pradesh
- Country: India
- Coordinates: 24°51′11.9″N 79°55′21.7″E

Architecture
- Creator: Chandela Rulers
- Temple: 1

The Nandi temple is a Hindu temple located in Khajuraho city of Madhya Pradesh, India. It is dedicated to Nandi, the bull which serves as the mount (vāhana) of Shiva, in Hindu mythology. As a common architecture trend, temples of Shiva (and Parvati) display stone images of a seated Nandi facing Shiva. Following the trend, this temple is located opposite to the Vishvanatha Temple, which is dedicate to Shiva.

This structure is one of the monument among Khajuraho Group of Monuments, a World Heritage Site in India.

== Location ==
The temple is located in the Western Group of Temple Complex Khajuraho. Inside the temple complex, it is located opposite to Vishvanath Temple.

Khajuraho is a small village in Chhatarpur District of Madhya Pradesh, India.

== Architecture ==
The temple stands on a rectangular modest (chabutara). The plan of the main structure is of the shape of cross quadrate (combination of cross and rectangle), where the rectangle form the sanctum and the cross edges form the four balconies (one on each side). The temples walls are like balcony walls and do not complete cover the sanctum completely. The roof rests on the pillars (one at each corner).

The border design is made of carvings depicting elephant (front view with head, trunk and two legs). Human figures are also depicted on both side of elephant.

Erotic sculpture of couples are also seen on the outer roof.

The sculpture of Shiva (with trishula on right shoulder; and snake on left shoulder) can also be seen on outer roof and wall(along with border design).

== Nandi Sculpture ==
The Nandi Sculpture (see image) is 2.2 m long and 1.8 m high.

== Gallery ==
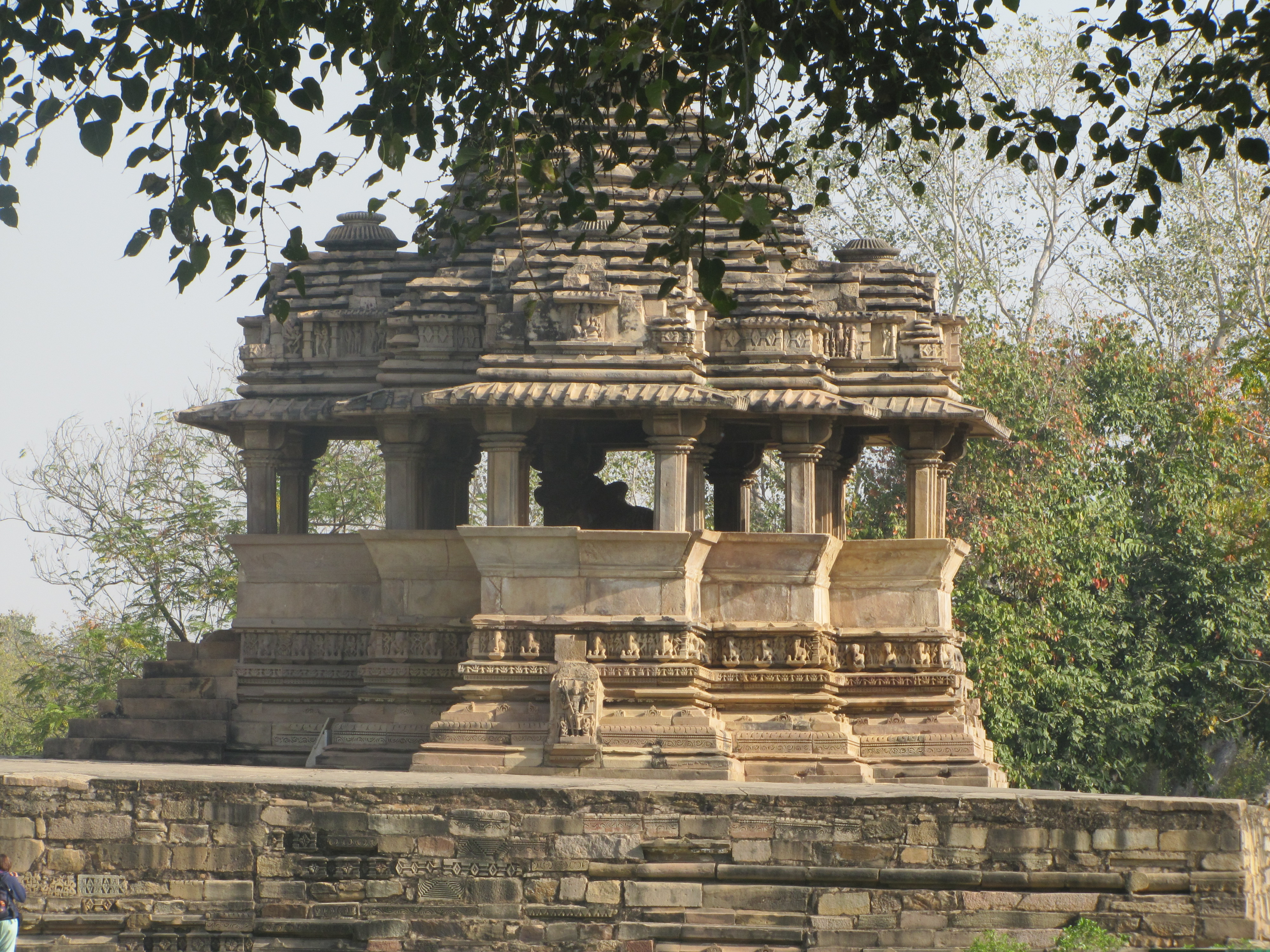
Nandi Temple, Khajuraho India

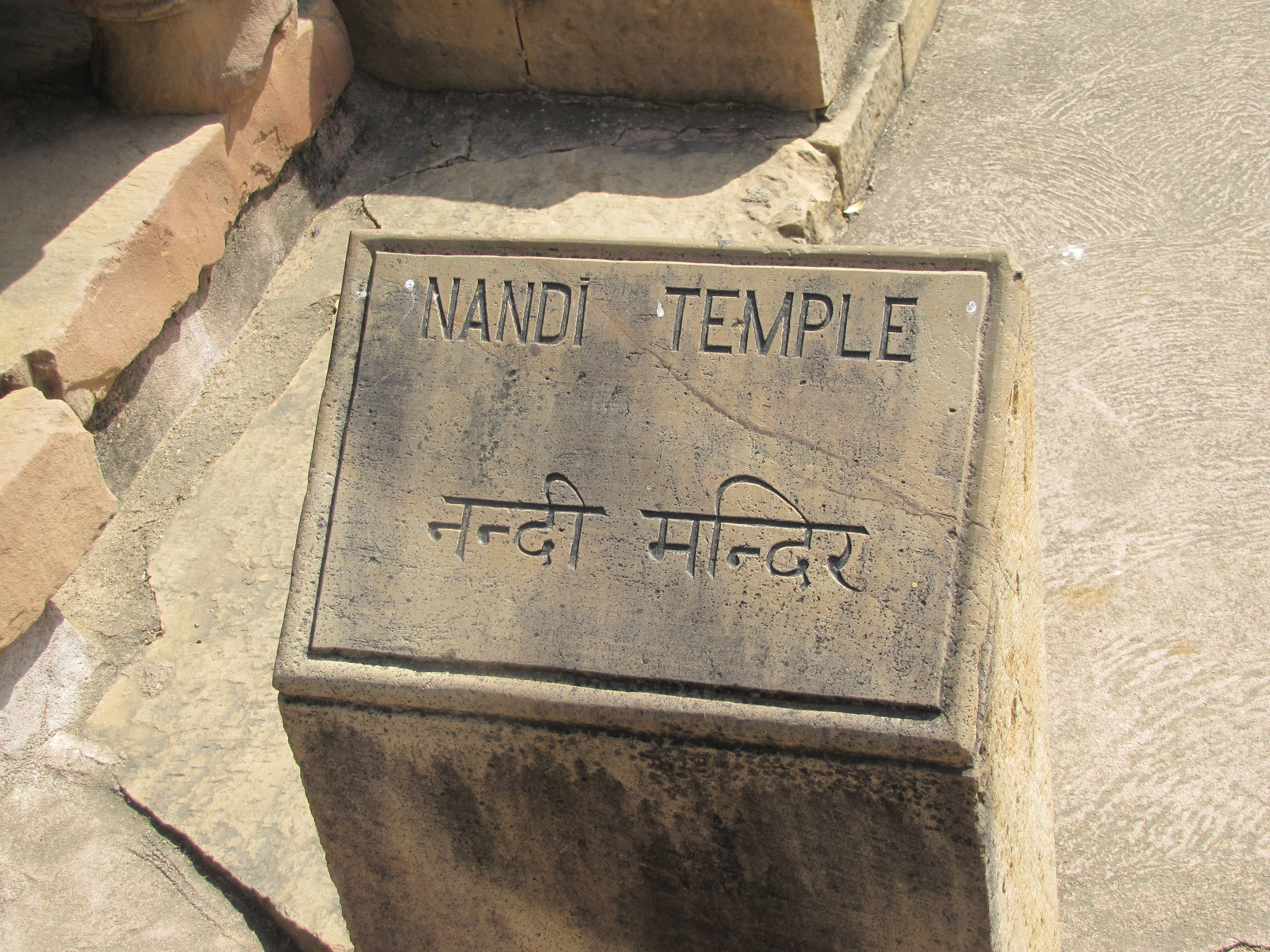
Identification Stone, Nandi Temple, Khajuraho India

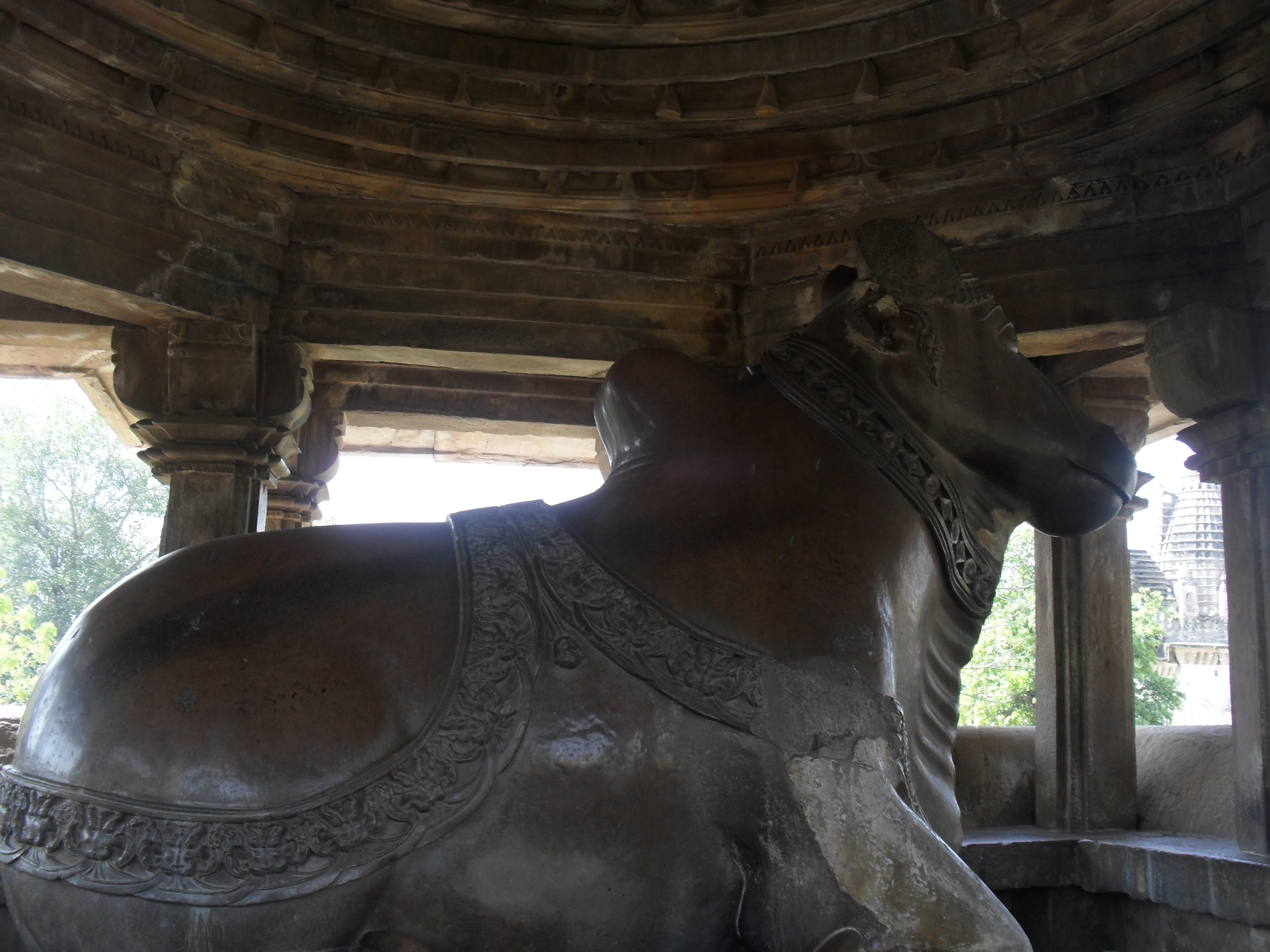
Nandi, Nandi Temple, Khajuraho India

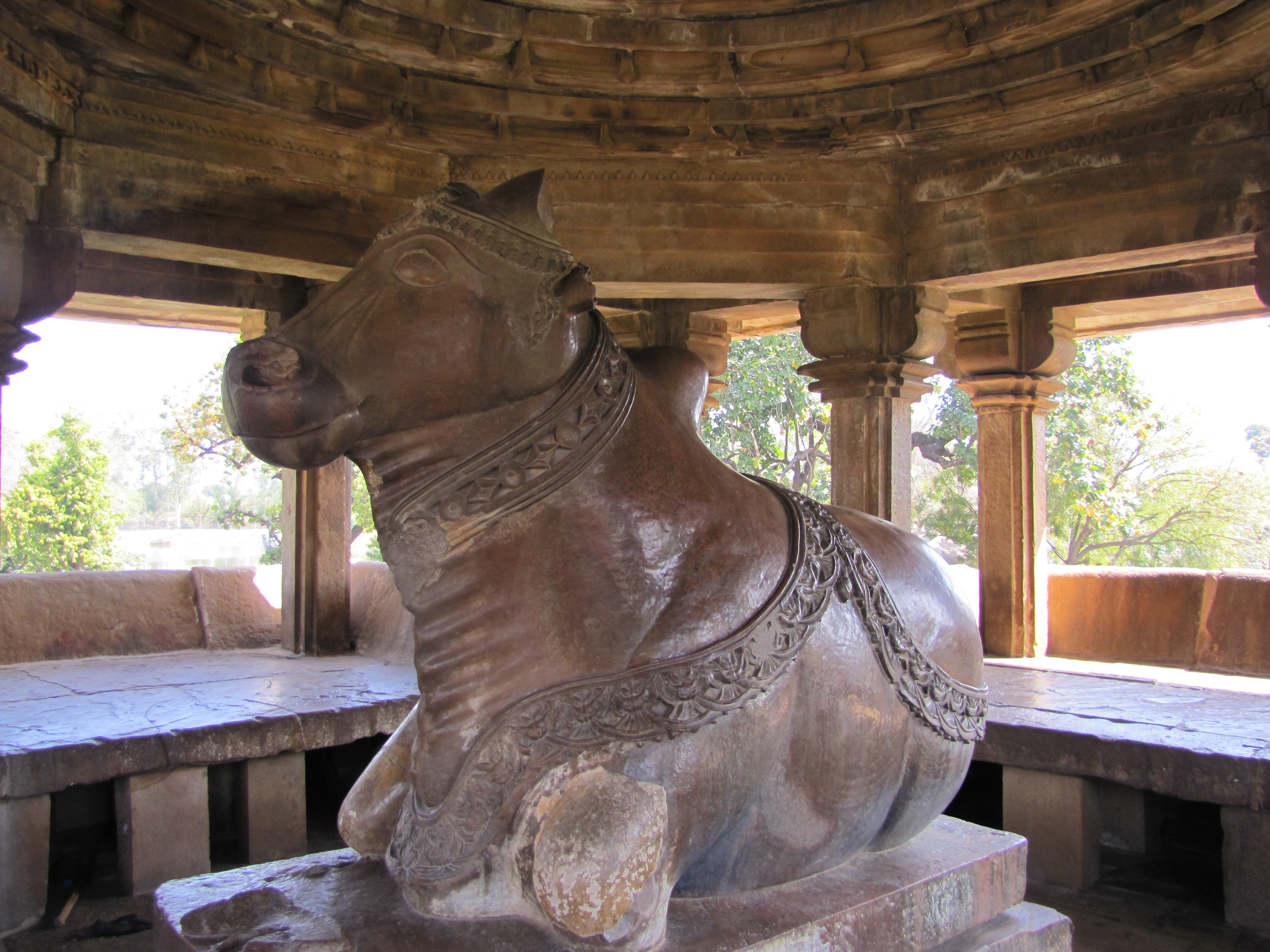
Nandi, Nandi Temple, Khajuraho India

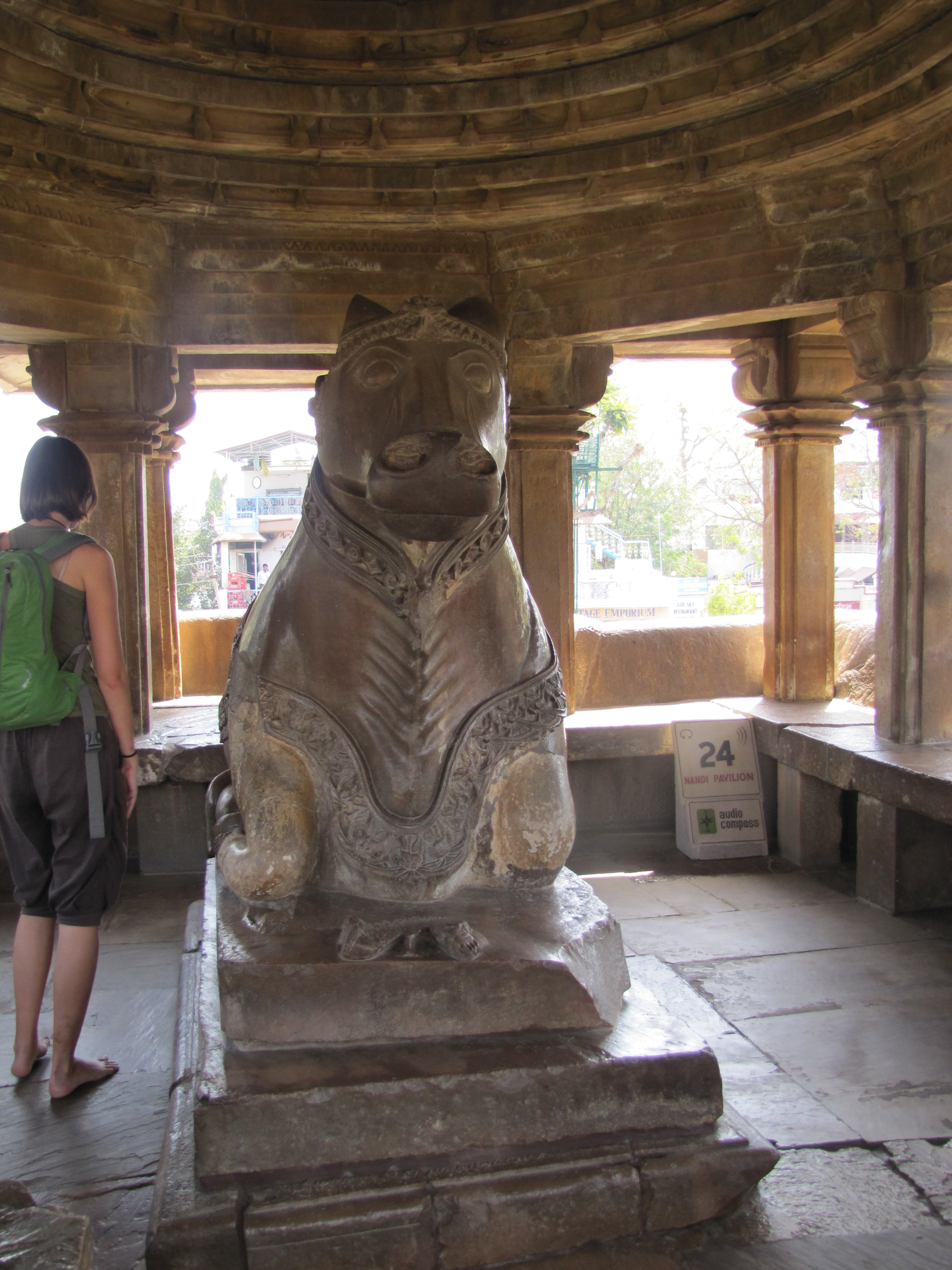
Nandi, Nandi Temple, Khajuraho India
