= Ismaili Centre, London =

Religious and cultural center for Ismailis

The Ismaili Centre, London
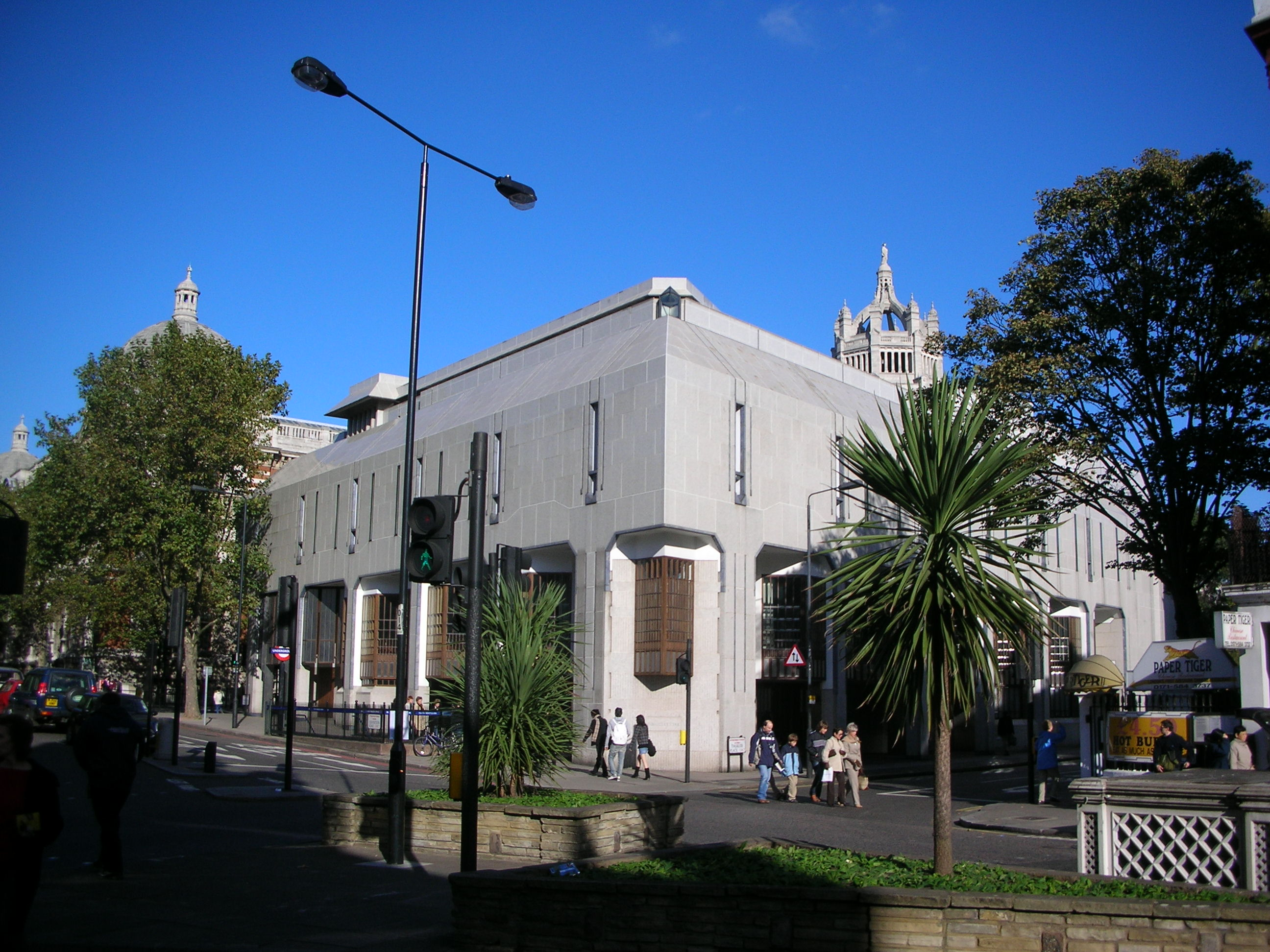
- View of the Ismaili Centre, London from Exhibition Road, with the Victoria and Albert Museum visible in the background

Religion
- Affiliation: Nizari Ismaili Muslim
- Leadership: His Highness the Aga Khan

Location
- Location: Cromwell Gardens, London, SW7
- Interactive map of The Ismaili Centre, London
- Coordinates: 51.4955°N 0.1731°W

Architecture
- Architect: Casson Conder Partnership
- Type: Jamatkhana
- Groundbreaking: 6 September 1979
- Completed: 1985

Website
- http://www.theismaili.org/ismailicentre/london

The Ismaili Centre, London, is one of seven Ismaili Centres worldwide. Established in South Kensington in 1979, it is a religious, social and cultural meeting place for the Ismaili Muslim community, the first so designed in the Western world.

== Establishment ==
The Ismaili Centre, London was inaugurated on 24 April 1985 by then Prime Minister Margaret Thatcher, in the presence of His Highness the Aga Khan, the 49th Imam (spiritual leader) of the Ismaili Muslims. It was the first religious, cultural and social space specifically designed for the Ismaili community in the Western world.

The Ismaili community had been in the United Kingdom since as early as 1951, when they established a religious, cultural and social centre at Kensington Court. It was moved to Palace Gate in 1957, but the needs of the growing community increased over time, and a site at Cromwell Gardens was acquired in the 1970s.

Lord Soames, the then Lord President of the Council, laid the foundation stone of the new Centre on 6 September 1979, in the presence of the Aga Khan. Construction began in July 1980.

== Surroundings and site history ==
Cromwell Gardens in London's South Kensington district where the Ismaili Centre is situated is a prominent location with a storied past. Immediately to the north on the opposite side of Cromwell Gardens is the Victoria and Albert Museum. To the south is Thurloe Place and to the west is Exhibition Road. The nearest tube station is South Kensington, close by to the south-west. It is linked by an underground passage that extends further north to the South Kensington museums.

The site had previously been owned by the Shakespeare Memorial National Theatre Committee, who in 1937 intended to construct a National Theatre on the site. However, the outbreak of the Second World War and a later realisation that the site was too small for their ambitions scuttled their plans.

In the 1860s, seven houses had been constructed on the 16,000-square-foot (1,500 m^{2}) plot, which was given the name "Cromwell Gardens". However, by 1912, heavy traffic around the site made the houses unattractive. Plans to establish a new Royal College of Art never materialised, but for a short spell Cromwell Gardens was home to the Institut Français.

After being earmarked for the National Theatre project, renowned British architect Sir Edwin Lutyens and Cecil Masey were appointed to design the site's new building and a building committee was established. Among its members was the English actor and theatre director Sir Lewis Casson, whose nephew, Sir Hugh Casson, eventually designed the Ismaili Centre.

When the theatre project fell through, the site lingered and fell in stature. When the plot was acquired for the Ismaili Centre in the late 1970s, it hosted a car-hire depot and a pre-fab office. Journalist Christopher Long, described the land between Thurloe Place and Cromwell Road as "arguably the most prominent and prestigious plot of development land in west London."

== Architecture ==
The area surrounding the Ismaili Centre includes prominent buildings with imposing façades such as the Natural History Museum and the Victoria and Albert Museum. The Centre's architectural called for the building to be compatible with its surroundings, while remaining true to the Islamic architectural tradition.

The building that Casson Conder Partnership produced is of a strikingly modern design. The exterior materials in whites, light greys and blues do not compete with those of the surrounding buildings. The Centre is subdued, yet it is bears a distinctly Islamic character. A particularly interesting architectural element is its roof-top charbagh garden.

Its design was not without its detractors, and it was the first (1982) winner of Private Eye's Hugh Casson Award for "worst new building of the year". Its "lumpishness, banality, repetitiveness and repulsiveness of texture" was cited as its reason for winning.

== Ethos and purpose ==
Conceived in a "spirit of peace and dialogue, the search for knowledge and human dignity," the Ismaili Centre embodies the Ismaili community's own outlook and understanding of "Islam as a thinking, spiritual faith." At the Centre's opening ceremony, the Aga Khan pledged the Centre as a "token of understanding between East and West" — it is a pledge that the Centre has gone on to fulfil.

Over the past 25 years, the Centre has opened its doors to the general public for exhibitions, lectures, and debates. Tens of thousands have experienced the building through guided tours conducted by trained volunteers, including royalty from various countries, prime ministers and senior political figures, leaders of industry, religious leaders, famous personalities, and regular Londoners. Since 2000, the Ismaili Centre has also participated in London's annual Open House, as well as Exhibition Road Music Day, a London version of Fête de la Musique.

By experiencing the architecture of the building and taking part in its programs, visitors broaden their understanding of Islam and its ethics, and of Muslim peoples and their values. This was observed by Prince Charles at the inauguration of Spirit and Life, an exhibition of the Aga Khan Museum collection that was held at the Centre: "I can only applaud your emphasis on intellectual and cultural exploration as a means of integration, and your determination to discharge your obligations as citizens of this country without losing your own distinctive traditions," he said of the Ismaili community in his inaugural remarks. "I have no doubt that the existence of shared values is a key defining factor. These values celebrate humility, greatness of soul, honour, magnanimity and, indeed, hospitality. They form the bedrock of the excellent outreach work of the Ismaili Centre."

== More information ==
- Ismaili Centres around the world (official website)
- Ismaili Centre, Vancouver (official website)
- Ismaili Centre, Lisbon (official website)
- Ismaili Centre, Dubai (official website)
- Ismaili Centre, Dushanbe (official website)
- Ismaili Centre, Toronto (official website)
