= Jama'at Khana =

Term used by some Muslim communities for a place of gathering

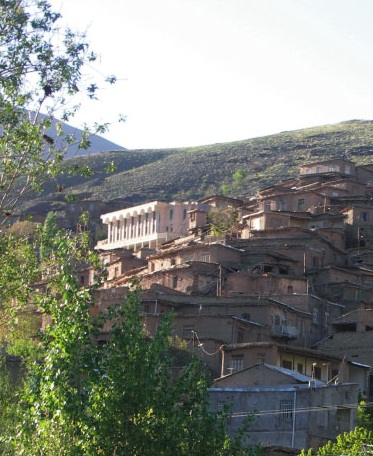
A Jama'at Khana in Nishapur, Razavi Khorasan Province, Iran.

Jamatkhana or Jamat Khana (from Persian: جماعت خانه, literally "congregational place") is an amalgamation derived from the Arabic word jama'a (gathering) and the Persian word khana (house, place). It is a term used by some Muslim communities around the world, particularly Sufi ones, to a place of gathering. Among some communities of Muslims, the term is often used interchangeably with the Arabic word musallah (a place of worship that has not been formally sanctified as a masjid or is a place that is being temporarily used as a place of worship by a Muslim). The Nizārī Ismā'īlī community uses the term Jama'at Khana to denote their places of worship.

== The Jamatkhana as a place of gathering and prayer ==
While the masjid (literally: the place of a Muslim's sujood or prostration before God) or mosque (in English) is the term used by the Qur'an to denote the primary space of salaat (communal Muslim prayers), a range of spaces for Islamic communal purposes can be currently found throughout the Muslim world. Some are concentrated within particular geographic regions while others are in use by specific communities. Some of these include: husayniyyas (also known as ashurkhanas, imambaras, matams, or takyehs in Iran) used by Ithna 'Ashari Shi'i communities; khanqahs, ribats, takyas and zawiyas used by mystically-oriented Muslim communities commonly referred to as Sufis; the cemevi of the Turkish Alevis; the cemxane of the Kurdish Alevis; and the majlis and khalwas of the Druze. For Nizārī Ismā'īlīs, the primary space of religious and social gathering is the Jamatkhana. The term Jamatkhana is also used to refer to spaces used by a number of other Muslim communities with bases in South Asia, such as the Chisti Sufi tariqa, and various branches of the Musta'li Ismaili community including the Dawoodi Bohras and Alavi Bohras.

The Chisti Sufi tariqa utilizes their Jamatkhanas as a meeting space for conversation and counsel with the pir or teacher. The Shi'i Bohra Ismaili communities use the term to designate their space for social gatherings and communal meals. It is customary amongst many Musta'li Ismaili communities in South Asia and their diasporas to have a Jamatkhana in the same complexes as their masjids. While the latter is the primary site for formal religious activities of the different branches of Bohra Ismailis – including the Da'udi, Sulaymani, and Alevi – the Jamatkhana acts as a site for less formalized religious gatherings, weddings, feasts and other events aligned with special days. Among Sunni Muslims known as Memons, the term Jamatkhana is used to denote a space for cultural gatherings and special occasions. Spaces designated as Jamatkhanas can also be seen in Mughal complexes, such as that of the Taj Mahal in Agra.

== The Jamatkhana in Nizārī Ismā'īlīsm ==
The exact origins of the use of Jamatkhana in the Nizārī Ismā'īlī tradition are not as yet clear. However, communal memory, oral traditions and individual Ginans (Indo-Muslim religious poems) narrate that Pirs Shams (fl. between 13th and 15th centuries) and Sadr al-Din (fl. 14th century), emissaries appointed by the Ismaili Imam in Persia and sent to the South Asia in the service of the faith, established the first such spaces for the nascent Nizārī Ismā'īlī communities in Sindh, Punjab, Kashmir and China during their lifetimes. Jannatpuri, a long composition known as a granth and belonging to the genre of the Ginans, by Sayyid Imamshah (d. after 1473) situates one of the earliest of these Jamatkhanas to a place by the name of Kotda, which is thought to be in modern-day Sindh in Pakistan. The same composition also mentions that the village headman, the mukhi (Sanskrit: mukhya) was closely associated with the Jamatkhana as an official.

=== Earliest Jamatkhanas ===
The Jamatkhana was a space particular to several localized Ismaili communities of the South Asia, primarily in delta regions. It was subsequently adopted by a wider range of Indian Ismaili communities in subsequent decades and centuries. These diverse groups, each with their own histories, identities and social organization identified themselves using various names such as Momin (or Mumna), Shamsi, Khoja and Gupti. Collectively, these communities adopted the practice of Satpanth (lit. true path), a designation for Shi'i Ismailism of this period in the Subcontinent which included communal congregation in the Jamatkhana.

The term seems to have come in use to designate the place of Satpanthi religious gathering fairly late, possibly not until the last decades of the 18th or early years of the 19th centuries. (Note: The prefix jamat does not seem to appear in front of the term khana amongst the Nizārī Ismā'īlīs in oral renditions or the earliest written texts. The first reference in the English language to the Jamatkhana appears to be in relation to a court case filed against the Khojas of Bombay by Aga Khan I in 1829, but which was later dropped, suggesting the term was in circulation by that point. See Aga Khan Case, pp. 352, 363, 363a. The term darkhana as applied to a Jamatkhana and not simply the Imam's residence was first seen in usage in 1870 when it was applied to a Jamatkhana in Bombay's Khadak district. Amongst the Imamshahis, the term khana is still used to designate the space used for congregational practices of the community. The term Jamatkhana is absent from their discourses. The term gatjamat referring to the congregation who gathered in this communal space can be found in many ginans.) The most common term used in the Nizārī Ismā'īlī ginans to refer to these spaces is the term gat. (Note: One of the most commonly recited ginans that includes this reference is "Gat Maa(n)he Aavine" (Come to the Space of Communal Congregation) attributed to Pir Sadr al-Din in the Khoja Nizārī Ismā'īlī tradition and Sayyid Imamshah in the Imamshahi tradition. Numerous other ginans also make reference to the gat as the congregational space of the community and the importance of the rituals that take place within it.)

=== Evolution of the Jamatkhana ===
By the mid-19th century, as Nizārī Ismā'īlī communities migrated from towns and villages to urban centres throughout the Indian Ocean littoral, the khana seems to have become a distinct space housed in a separate structure, usually located within a mohalla, or enclave, of Satpanthi believers. Several of the oldest extant examples of Jamatkhanas go back to this period. Most, however, have subsequently been renovated and added to, to accommodate the changing functional needs and ritual practices of the jamats (congregation) that they serve. The oldest of these urban structures can be found in places such as Gwadar (present day Pakistan), Zanzibar and Bombay (present day India). More modest examples that date from this period can also be found throughout Kutch and in Jerruk in interior Sindh, the residence of Aga Khan I upon his arrival to the South Asia. The architecture and organization of these spaces tell us that there was no single architectural template or model of the Jamatkhana, but rather each was constructed based on a series of circumstances including such things as location, cultural environment, architectural practices of the period and resources available. The variations from one Jamatkhana to the next also gives us clues to the nature of practices, the use and allocation of space and the nature and function of social relationships. Some of these were due to the cultural milieu in which the Jamatkhanas were situated while others followed general traditions of pietic and religious culture, which in turn informed rules of decorum and etiquette within these spaces.

In 1870, the Bombay Jamatkhana in Khadak became the first Jamatkhana assigned as a darkhana. (Note: However, it is possible that the term was in use somewhat earlier. In Kahak, Iran, there are a number of gravestones which speak about one "Kamadia Datardina Wandani of Darkhana jamat" who came to visit the Imam. The Gujarati-language Khojki inscription places Wandani's death in 1803. See Ivanow, W. "Tombs of Some Persian Ismaili Imams," Journal of the British Bombay Royal Asiatic Society, New Serial, Vol. 14 (1938), pp. 58-59. In the contemporary period, the Ismaili Centre, London was dedicated as the first darkhana on April 24, 1985 upon its opening.) The term, was initially used to designate the chief residence of the Imam. In later years, however, it came to stand for the principal Jamatkhana in a national context. Today, nine countries have Darkhana Jamatkhanas in the Nizārī Ismā'īlī tradition. These include India, Tanzania, Kenya, Uganda, Canada, Pakistan, England, Portugal, and the USA.

=== Jamatkhana as the Centre of Nizārī Ismā'īlī Practice ===
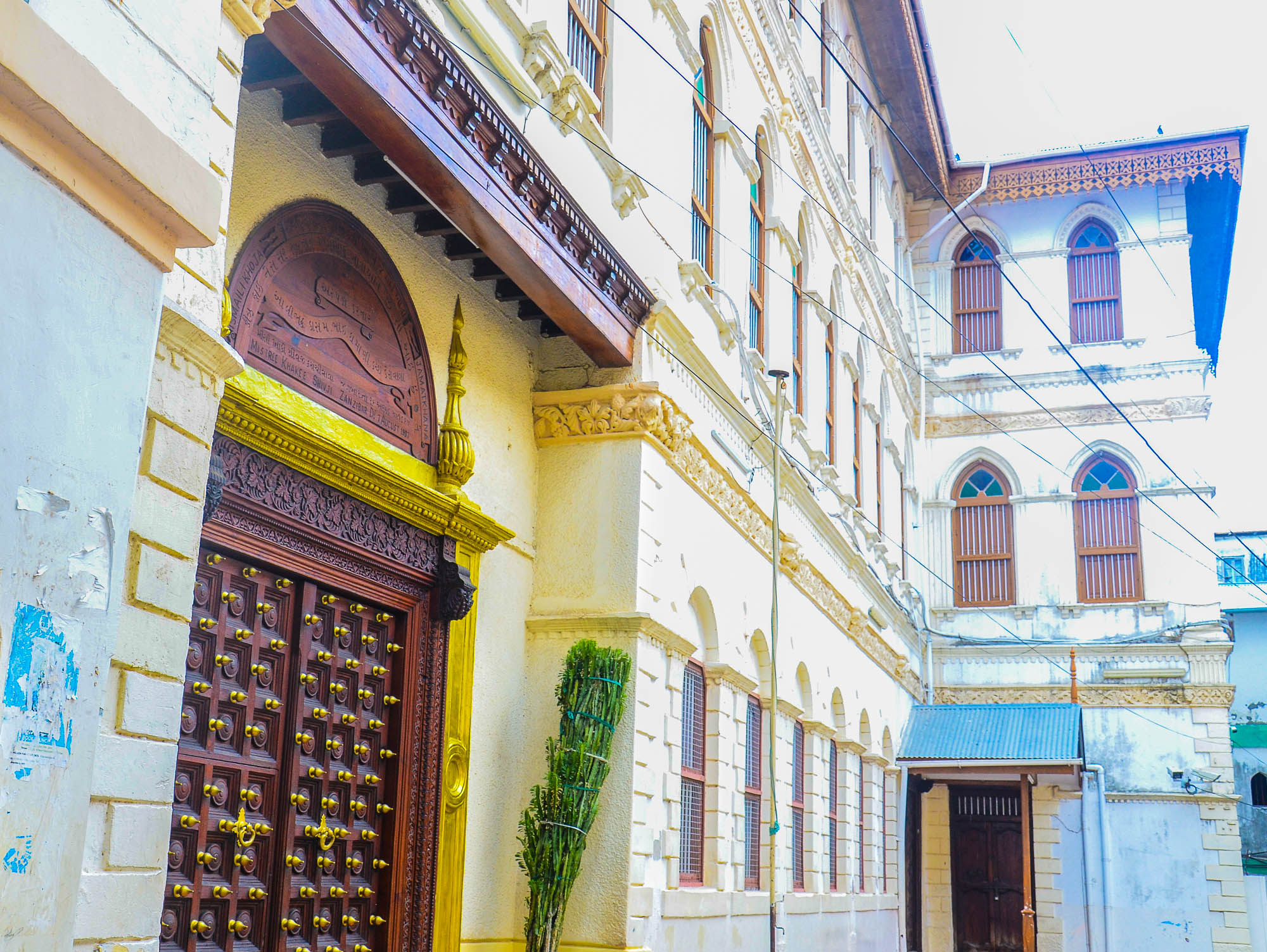
Aga Khan Jamatkhana in Zanzibar, Tanzania. This was the first Shi'a mosque to be built in East Africa.

While the Jamatkhana initially began as a space of congregation specific to Satpanthi communities, it eventually was adopted by Ismaili communities with different geographic, cultural and linguistic backgrounds and historical experiences who before this congregated in spaces with different trajectories and nomenclatures. During the seven decades of Sir Sultan Mohammed Shah, Aga Khan III's (d. 1957) Imamat, formal relationships with Ismaili communities living in Tajikistan, Afghanistan, China, the Northern Areas of Pakistan, Persia and Syria, were strengthened.

Ismailis of the Northern Areas of Pakistan, namely Chitral, Ghizr, Gilgit, Hunza, as well as the border regions of China, were some of the first communities to adopt the Jamatkhana into their ritual life. But these Jamat Khana's were not open spaces like the other Jamat Khana's, due to political restrictions, the followers use to meet at a designated house and perform all the rituals. They use to practice their faith in hiding, and in Punjab, were known as the shamsi, or secretive (gupti) community.

The seeds of these institutions were planted in 1923 when a missionary by the name of Ramzanali Sabzali (d. 1938) was sent to these various communities by Aga Khan III. (Note: The diary of Missionary Sabzali, posthumously endowed with the title of pir by Imam Sultan Mahomed Shah, is extant. It was first published in Gujarati as "Alijah Missionary Sabzalibahi'ni Musafar," in the weekly Ismaili (Bombay) between February 17, 1924 and December 5, 1926. A significantly edited version of the text was also published serially in the Ismaili Crescent (Dar es Salaam) between January 8, 1967 and April 2, 1968. This again was reproduced in the fortnightly community magazine Paigham (Karachi) between February 15, 1967 and April 15, 1970 and again in the Ismaili between March 21 and October 6, 1967. This version culminated in the publication of the serialisation of the journey as a book printed by the Ismaili Printing Press in Bombay in 1968, entitled Pir Sabzali'ni Madhaya Asia'ni Musafari." A version prepared by Sabzali's personal secretary, Ramzan Ali Alibhai first appeared in the Platinum Jubilee Bulletin (Bombay) between July 15 and October 1, 1953 and was edited by Jafar Ali H. Lakhani. An English translation is available online as "Voyage of Pir Sabzali in Central Asia," translated by Mumtaz Tajddin) Jamatkhanas were also introduced in Syria in the period of the 1940s. It was not however, until the tenure and leadership of the present Imam of the Ismailis, His Highness Prince Karim Aga Khan (b. 1936) that similar spaces were also introduced in Iran (1960s), Afghanistan (1960s and 2001) and Tajikistan (2009). In parts of Iran, spaces referred to as khane-ye kolon and khanqah preceded the Jamatkhana.

=== Nizārī Ismā'īlī Centres ===
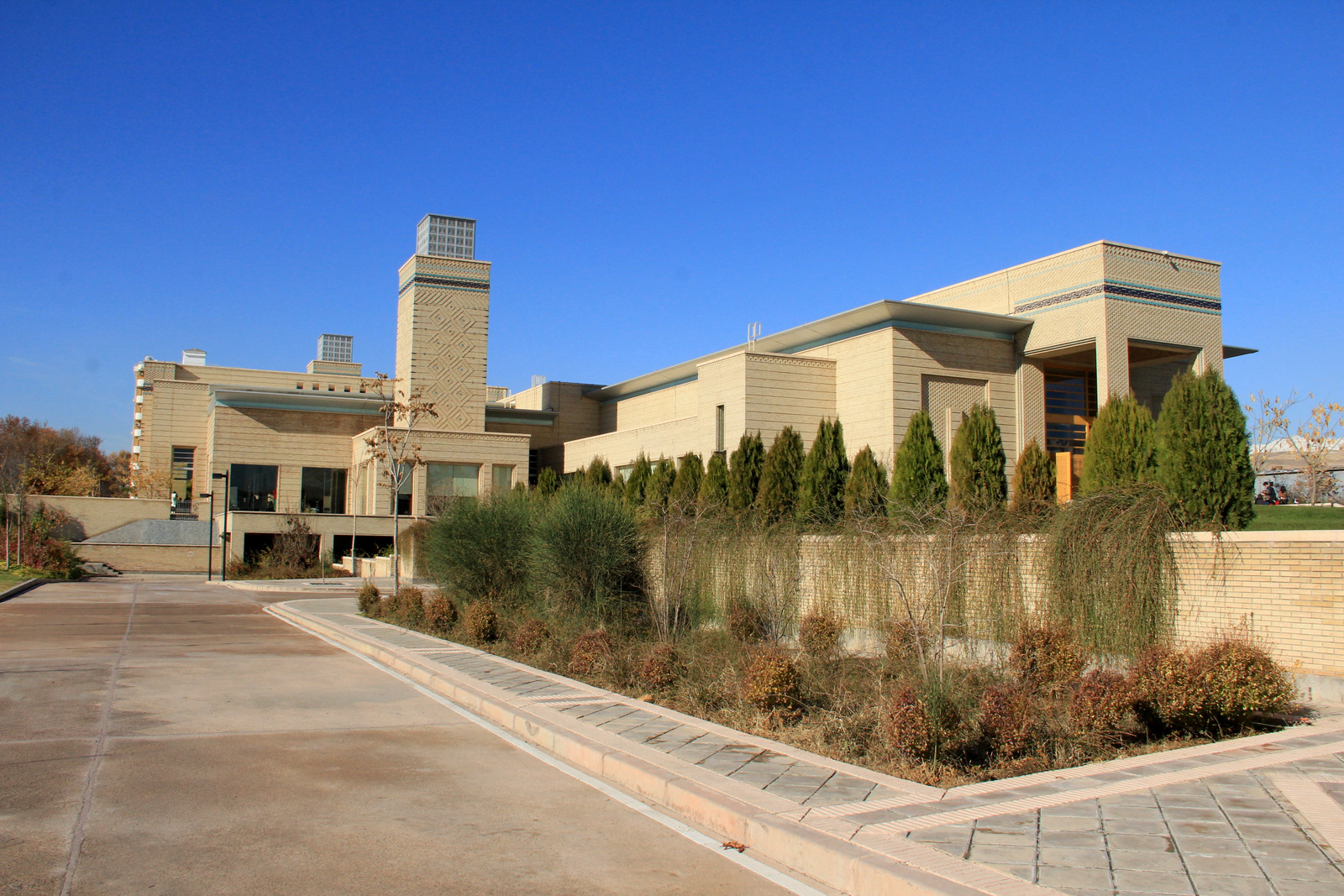
Ismaili Centre in Dushanbe.

In 1979, the foundation stone was laid for what was to become the first 'Ismaili Centre' in London's South Kensington neighbourhood. The high-profile building which was opened by Prime Minister Margaret Thatcher (1925–2013; r. 1979–1990) in the presence of His Highness the Aga Khan in April 1985 was an important chapter in a new era of Ismaili presence in Europe. Several months later in August, another Ismaili Centre was opened in Vancouver's Burnaby district (Canada) by Prime Minister Brian Mulroney (1939–2024; r. 1984–1993). (Note: The Foundation Stone Ceremony was conducted on July 24, 1982 and the building was officially opened on August 23, 1985.) Each architecturally unique, these purpose built centres constructed by internationally reputed architects occupy prominent places in their respective cities and include, in addition to the central prayer hall, spaces to facilitate intellectual and social gatherings, meeting rooms, educational facilities, libraries, gardens and water features. The buildings were not only meant to act as symbolic markers of the Ismaili community's presence in England and Canada, but also as an ambassadorial bridge which would continue to help them develop and maintain relationships with other faith groups and civil society organizations.

In 1998, the third such 'Ismaili Centre' was opened in Lisbon, Portugal. The Centre draws inspiration from regional influences of the Moorish architectural heritage such as the Alhambra in Granada as well as that of other Muslim cultural forms such as that of Fatehpur Sikri in India. In particular, the interplay and combination of outdoor and indoor spaces gave the building a different aesthetic and feel from the other Ismaili Centres that had been designed two decades earlier, further demonstrating how time and space influence contemporary Ismaili religious architecture.

The first Ismaili Centre in the Middle East was opened in Dubai, United Arab Emirates on March 26, 2008, by the Aga Khan in the presence of senior members of the ruling family of Dubai. The centre, built on land donated by the Shaykh Mohammed b. Rashid al-Maktoum, Dubai's ruler in 1982, is the first such Centre in the Middle East. The building draws its inspiration from Cairo's Fatimid architecture heritage, a dynasty founded by the Aga Khan's forefathers and previous Imams of the Nizārī Ismā'īlī community in the tenth century.

An Ismaili Centre in Dushanbe, the capital of Tajikistan, firmly located in the Persian-speaking Muslim world, reflects and marks the centuries of Ismaili presence in Central Asia and surrounding regions. Opened on October 12, 2009, by Republic's President, Emamoli Rahmon and the Aga Khan, its architecture blends a diverse range of artisanal and craft traditions of the region and draws upon as inspiration of the grand courtyards of Samarkand and Khiva in Uzbekistan as well as the tenth century Samanid mausoleum. Technical innovations include earthquake resistant roofing which transfers structural stress, a heating and air conditioning system based on water source heat pumps and a heat recovery wheel for energy efficiency.

The second Ismaili Centre to be built in Canada, the Ismaili Centre, Toronto, was opened in 2014 in Toronto's Don Mills area and follows the pattern of earlier buildings, representing functionally and symbolically the presence of Ismaili communities in Europe and North America. The Ismaili Centre in Toronto is the largest such centre in the English-speaking world. The Toronto Ismaili Centre shares its grounds with the Aga Khan Museum, both of which sit in the Aga Khan Park.

Further Ismaili Centres, in various stages of development will follow shortly: centres in Houston, Texas and Los Angeles, California are being planned.

== See also ==
- Gymkhana, Anglo-Indian term derived from the Persian word Jamat-khana
