= Ismaili Center, Houston =

Ismaili center in the United States

Coordinates: 29.7593°N 95.3917°W

Ismaili Centre, Houston

Religion
- Affiliation: Islam
- Branch/tradition: Shia
- Rite: Nizari Ismaili
- Ecclesiastical or organisational status: Jama'at Khana
- Year consecrated: 2025
- Status: Active

Location
- Location: 2323 Allen Parkway, Houston, Texas
- Country: United States
- Interactive map of Ismaili Centre, Houston

Architecture
- Architect: Farshid Moussavi
- Type: Jama'at Khana
- Founder: Aga Khan V
- Established: 2025

Specifications
- Interior area: 150,000 sq ft (14,000 m^{2})
- Site area: 11 acres (4.5 ha)

Website
- ismailicenter.org

The Ismaili Center Houston is the seventh Ismaili Centre worldwide, the first in the United States and the third in North America, after Vancouver and Toronto.

== Establishment ==
Aga Khan Foundation USA has owned the eleven-acre site since 2006. The establishment of an Ismaili Center was announced by His Highness the Aga Khan during his Golden Jubilee visit to the USA in 2008.

A design preview was held on November 15, 2021, where architect Farshid Moussavi discussed the project with KTRK-TV’s Melanie Lawson.

In September 2025, McCarthy Building Companies, Inc. announced that it was nearing completion of the 150,000-square-foot center. A topping out ceremony was held in October 2023 with Mayor of Houston Sylvester Turner.

A grand dedication ceremony was held November 6, 2025. A crowd 500 guests was addressed by Mayor of Houston John Whitmire and Aga Khan V, the spiritual leader of the Shia Ismaili Muslims. This marked the center's soft opening with full public access planned for December.

== Architecture and design ==
Designed by London-based Farshid Moussavi Architecture in Association with DLR Group, the Center is a contemporary interpretation of traditional Persian ornamentation,[2] including ceramic mosaics, and screens drawn from various Islamic traditions. The center’s façade is a combination of different types of stone and steel encased in concrete. The building features a series of “eivans,” the Persian word for verandas, which will provide shaded venues for social gatherings at the center. The eivans are supported by 49 columns reminiscent of those used in Persepolis and 17th century palaces in Isfahan, Persia.

The 10 acres around the center were transformed into lush gardens by Thomas Woltz of Nelson Byrd Woltz Landscape Architects. The gardens include tree canopies, fountains, shaded footpaths, flowerbeds, lawns and walkways.

The design of the building and gardens is documented in Spaces of Sociability: The Ismaili Center Houston ISBN 978-3-96680-055-6.

== See also ==
- Islam in Houston
