= 2023 Lisbon Ismaili Centre stabbing =

Stabbing attack in Lisbon, Portugal

- Location: Ismaili Muslim Centre in Lisbon, Lisbon, Portugal
- Date: 28 March 2023
- Attack type: Mass stabbing
- Weapon: Knife
- Deaths: 2
- Injuries: 2 (including the perpetrator)
- Perpetrator: Abdul Bashir
- Motive: Under investigation

On the morning of 28 March 2023, two Portuguese women belonging to the staff of the Ismaili Muslim Centre in Lisbon were stabbed to death. The alert was received by Polícia de Segurança Pública (PSP) at 10.57am and Abdul Bashir, an Afghan refugee enrolled at the centre, was arrested. A professor of Portuguese for foreigners at the centre and a female Afghan refugee attending Portuguese language classes were threatened at knifepoint and injured. On 29 March, Luís Neves, the national director of the Polícia Judiciária ruled out terrorism citing no "minimum evidence" of radicalization attributing the stabbing to the perpetrator's "psychotic outbreak". But on 31 March, the Public Prosecution Service did not rule out terrorism as the motive of the crime, which as of May 2023 was still under investigation.

== Perpetrator ==
Abdul Bashir, a widowed 28-year-old Afghan refugee and father of three children aged 9, 7 and 4, had arrived to the European Union (EU) after entering Greece, where his wife died in the Moria refugee camp fire on 30 September 2019. He is a Shia Muslim of the Ismaili minority of Afghanistan.

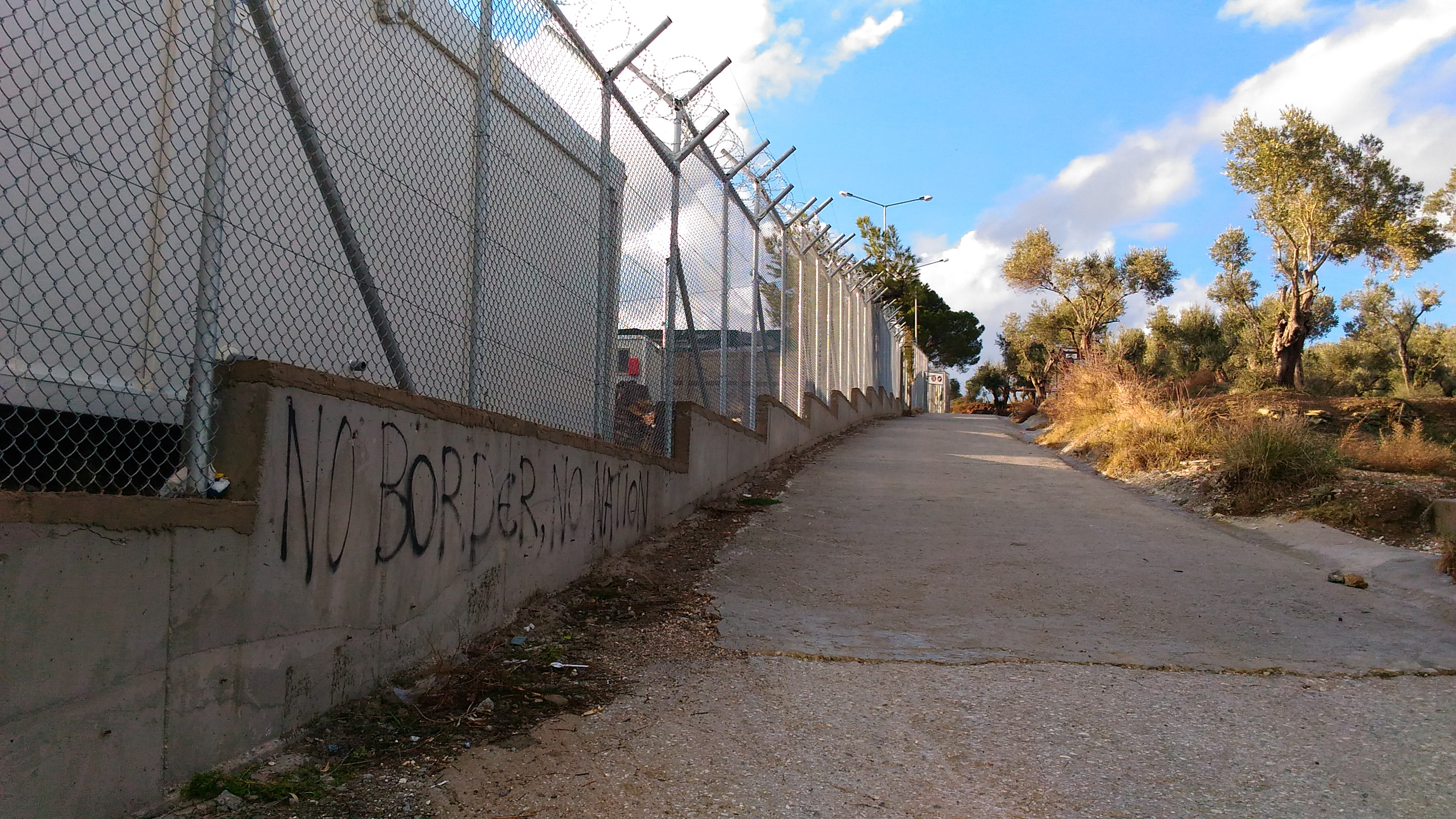
Outskirts of Moria refugee camp in Lesbos, Greece, on 15 January 2017.

He had been a telecommunications technician in Kabul, where he worked for Huawei, had left Afghanistan around 2015 and arrived to a Greek refugee camp in 2019. In a 2021 video made while he was living in a Greek refugee camp, Abdul Bashir lamented in English the death of his wife in an accidental fire five months into their arrival as irregular immigrants at Lesbos, Greece, stated that his life was very hard for him and his three children, and talked about his requests for help directed to the UNHCR and of his telecommunications engineering degree. In October 2021, he was relocated to Portugal under the formal EU refugee resettlement system through a bilateral Greece-Portugal agreement with the help of the Aga Khan Foundation, and received support (administrative advice, food and shelter assistance, Portuguese language lessons, and sewing classes) from Lisbon's Ismaili Centre until the attack. He was actively seeking for a job in Portugal but without success, a situation that was making him feel frustrated. After he arrived in EU territory, Bashir applied for refugee status in Germany but his pretentions were rejected by the German authorities. At the date of the stabbing he was still trying to leave Portugal and move to Germany with his children.

In Portugal, Bashir lived with his three children in a rented flat in Odivelas paid for by the Ismaili Centre and was described by neighbours and staff of a bakery near his house as a caring father and a calm and polite person, but unable to speak Portuguese.

On 28 March 2023, the alert was received by Polícia de Segurança Pública (PSP) at 10.57am and it took about a minute to respond. At the scene of the crime on the premises of Lisbon's Ismaili Centre, police said he was armed with a large knife. When he remained aggressive and failed to drop his weapon as the police demanded, he was shot in the leg by PSP officers and sent to the São José Hospital for treatment after his arrest.

After the stabbing, members of Lisbon's Ismaili community reported to the Polícia Judiciária (PJ), Portuguese criminal investigation police, that Bashir had developed an obsession towards the younger victim, 24-year-old Mariana Jadaugy, who had rejected him. According to a brother of the older victim, he was an unusually demanding, problematic and impulsive refugee.

A few days after the crime in Lisbon, Greek police began investigating the role of Abdul Bashir in the Greek refugee camp fire that killed his wife.

== Victims ==
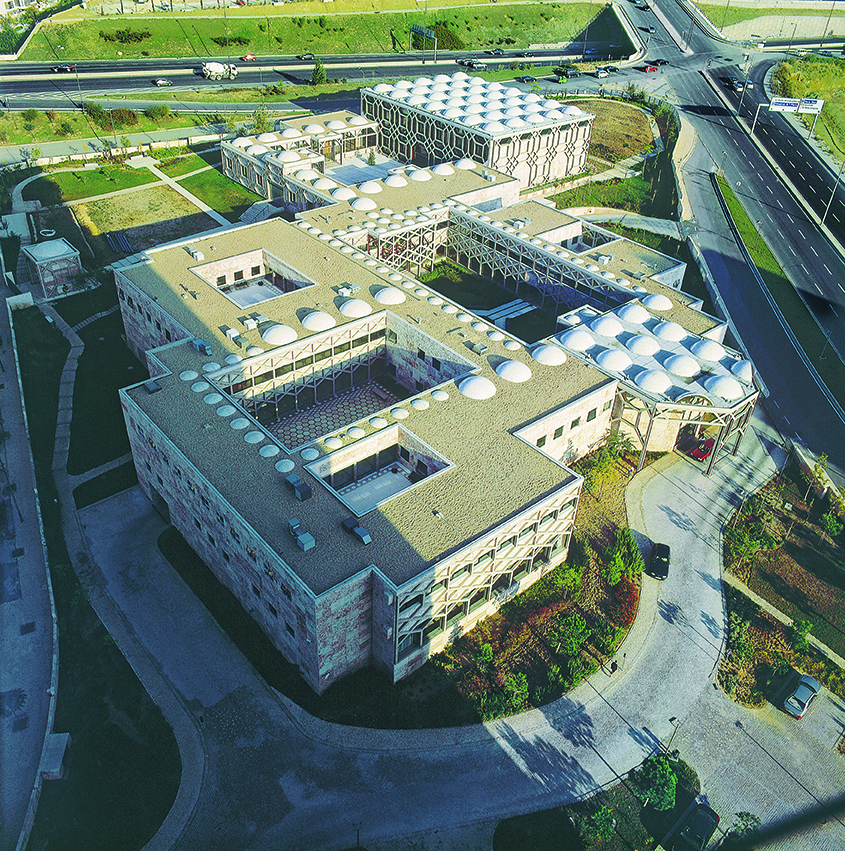
Aerial view of the Ismaili Centre, Lisbon

Mariana Jadaugy, a 24-year-old Portuguese citizen and caseworker at the Portuguese humanitarian foundation Fundação FOCUS - Assistência Humanitária, and Farana Sahbudin Sadrudin, 49, Portuguese national director of the Fundação FOCUS - Assistência Humanitária, were killed after they left their offices in the Ismaili Centre to assist a male language teacher with the altercation unfolding in Bashir's classroom, in which the Portuguese language teacher was injured and afterwards received medical treatment for neck, head, and other upper body injuries.

The Fundação FOCUS, belonging to FOCUS Europe, which was established by the Nizari Ismaili community under the auspices of the Aga Khan Development Network, was the organization at which the two women developed Muslim refugee and immigrant integration activities at the Ismaili Centre. In the course of their work at the organization, Jadaugy and Sadrudin were directly responsible for Bashir's social integration process in Portugal, a service which had provided free housing and food for his family and prepared his family's application for naturalization.

=== Homages and funerals ===
Mariana Jadaugy, 24, was an alumna of both the NOVA University Lisbon (political science and international relations) and the University of Lisbon (development and international cooperation), came from a Catholic family, had two older twin brothers and was a supporter of Sporting Clube de Portugal. Both the universities and the sports club, expressed condolences paying homages to her. Her funeral ceremony took place in a Catholic church in Belas, Sintra.

Farana Sahbudin Sadrudin, 49, who was born in Portuguese Mozambique, came from an Ismaili Muslim family, had previously studied informatics technical engineering in the Setúbal Polytechnic Institute and worked for insurance firm AXA in Portugal, Spain and Morocco, was niece of Nazim Ahmad, diplomatic representative of the Imamat Ismaili in Portugal. Her funeral ceremony took place in the Ismaili Centre.

== Reactions ==
Representatives of the Afghan community in Portugal (ACAP - Associação da Comunidade de Afegãos em Portugal) came out in favour of maximum sentence of imprisonment for Bashir in accordance with the Portuguese law (the Portuguese Penal Code states that no person may be sentenced to a prison term longer than 25 years).

The Polícia de Segurança Pública (PSP, Public Security Police in English) announced that the first responders would be awarded the Public Safety Award, an honour given to PSP police officers who carry out life-threatening acts and save lives on duty.

== Investigation ==
Abdul Bashir received a phone call while in the classroom on the morning of 28 March 2023, informing him that he could not travel because an official document wouldn't be granted to him, even though he had already planned to travel to Zurich, Switzerland. Neves claimed that once there, Bashir might have wanted to stay in Switzerland or reach Germany, from where he had already been sent back to Lisbon, as it was Portugal that had granted him refugee status. After that phone call, Bashir used a large-sized knife he had concealed in his backpack to start the attack.

Bashir was accepted by the Lisbon Ismaili Centre as an Afghan Shia Muslim of the Ismaili minority. Investigative work performed in the course of the immediate aftermath of the stabbing claimed that Bashir had taken photos with a Afghanistan Ismaili leader who used to hold significant political and military influences during 1980s and 1990s in Afghanistan Other sources claim that the Naderi Ismaili leaders have been leading Nizari Isma'ilis during the civil war and other internal conflicts of Afghanistan appointed by the Aga Khan and by doing so, Naderi Ismailis in Afghanistan are not dissidents disloyal to the Aga Khan.

Several sources claim that Bashir was romantically interested in the younger woman he killed on that day. Initial declarations of the PJ on 29 March, ruled out terrorism as the motive for the crime. On 30 March, Bashir's apartment in Odivelas was searched by the PJ, and on 31 March the Public Prosecution Service stated it would not rule terrorism out as a motive in the case.

At the same time, according to the Greek police, he was being regarded as a suspect in the Greek refugee camp fire that had killed his wife in 2019. Greek police noted that Abdul Bashir saved his children from the fire but didn't tell firefighters that his wife was still inside the house. Bashir was sent to Portugal in 2021 after a formal agreement between the Portuguese Interior Ministry and the Ministry of Migration and Asylum of Greece was reached while the criminal investigation of the fire was still in progress.
