= Ismaili Centre, Dubai =

Ismaili center in the UAE

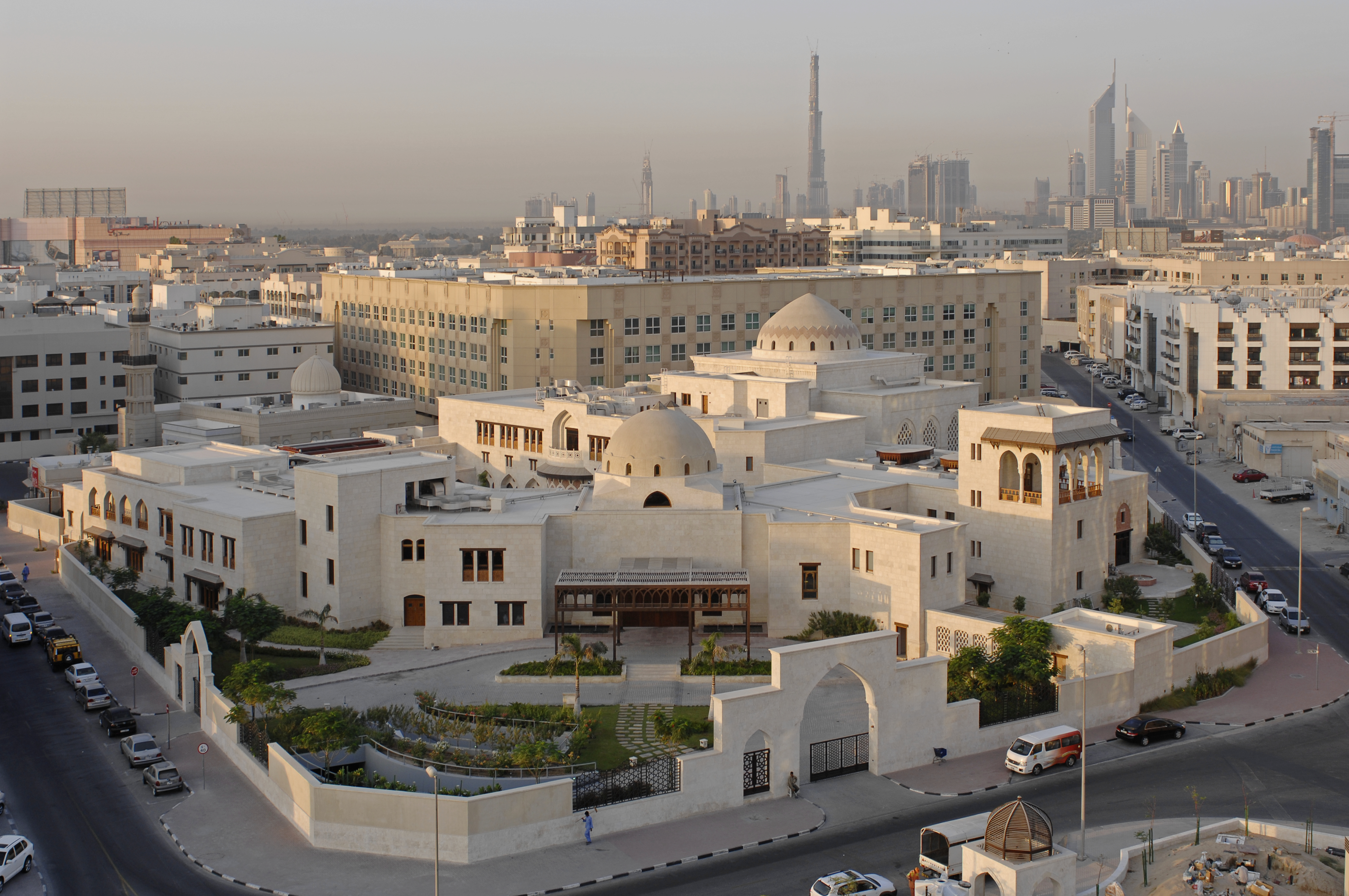
- Picture of Ismaili Centre, Dubai

Religion
- Affiliation: Shia Islam
- Rite: Nizari Ismaili
- Status: Active

Location
- Location: 8th St - Oud Metha - Dubai - United Arab Emirates
- Country: United Arab Emirates

Architecture
- Architects: Rami El Dahan and Soheir Farid
- Style: Islamic architecture
- Founder: His Highness the Aga Khan
- Groundbreaking: 13 December 2003
- Completed: 2008

Website
- the.ismaili/ca/spaces/ismaili-centre-dubai

The Ismaili Centre, Dubai is a 13,000-square-meter structure designed by the Egyptian duo Rami El Dahan and Soheir Farid, who drew inspiration from Cairo's Fatimid mosques. The Ismaili Centres are symbolic markers of the permanent presence and core values of Ismaili communities around the world. Architecturally unique, they are bridges of friendship and understanding, and serve to enhance relationships among communities, government and civil society. The Ismaili Centre in Dubai is a unique place that combines architectural cues with a mission to help people find individual spiritual peace and fellowship within their local and global community.

== Establishment ==
The Ismaili Centre, Dubai, inaugurated in 2008, was established on land gifted by the ruling family of Dubai and presented by Shaikh Mohammad to the Aga Khan in 1982 on the occasion of the Silver Jubilee of his accession to the Imamat. Commissioned by His Highness the Aga Khan, spiritual leader of the Shia Ismaili Muslims, the building, like all Ismaili centres, follows spatial principles that coincide with the Islamic branch's teachings. The foundation ceremony was attended by His Highness Sheikh Ahmed Bin Saeed Al Maktoum, Deputy Chairman of the Dubai Executive Council and President of the Department of Civil Aviation representing Sheikh Mohammed Bin Rashid Al Maktoum, the Crown Prince of Dubai. Speaking at the opening ceremony, His Highness the Aga Khan described the centre as “not only a place for peaceful contemplation, but one that is set in a social context. It is not the place to hide from the world, but rather a place which inspires us to engage our worldly work as a direct extension of our faith.”

== Architecture ==
The Ismaili Centre's design brief described a desire for a sequential, experiential and integrated use of space. Clear emphasis was placed on ensuring order and harmony and on fostering mutual respect and understanding both within the Ummah and across society at large. At the same time, the Ismaili Centre was expected to be a metaphor for a time of renewed vigour, growth, and commitment. The design and construction would need to take account of Dubai's climate, indigenous building and craft traditions and methodologies, as indeed of coherent landscaping. In an environment where glass and concrete towers have often set the trend, the objective was to allow innovation to draw on tradition, all the while preserving symmetry, rhythm, unity, and continuity.

The centre is a domed structure inspired by the Fatimid architecture of old Egypt and Syria. The centre was constructed with the use of traditional materials and craftsmanship. Its seven domes were built in brick and wood by Kashmiri masons using increasingly rare traditional construction skills. The Centre houses an Early Childhood Learning Centre which offers an educational programme to young children on a secular and non-denominational basis at the highest international standards of excellence.

Dubai's Ismaili Centre is a bridge between tradition and modernity, suspended timelessly amid an environment cluttered with glass and concrete towers. And while the building features canonical elements found in Islamic architecture, like domes, vaults and corbels, the execution and attitude toward materiality is principally modern.

It exemplifies the architectural principles of Egyptian modernist architect Hassan Fathy, designed by the husband-and-wife team Rami El Dahan and Soheir Farid, who worked under the late architect's mentorship for 10 years who was renowned for his “architecture for the people”. They sought inspiration from the Fatimid mosques of Cairo.

Adjacent to the centre, the Aga Khan Trust for Culture (AKTC) has developed a 3,000 square metre park, which was designed by renowned landscape architect Maher Stino, who also designed the 74-acre Al-Azhar Park in Cairo, Egypt, another AKTC project.

== Purpose ==
The main purpose of the centre is to encourage mutual exchange and understanding between diverse peoples, communities and faiths. Each building incorporates spaces for social and cultural gatherings, intellectual engagement and reflection, as well as spiritual contemplation. Through its design and function, the centre reflects a mood of humility, forward outlook, friendship and dialogue.

The centre offers a range of cultural and educational activities. It has been built over an area of about 13,000 square meters and also houses an early learning centre which has intake capacity of 225 children. The centre will provide facilities to promote cultural, educational and social programmes from the broadest, non-denominational perspective within the ethical framework of Islam.

In October 2021, Ismaili Centre Dubai hosted the second Annual Aga Khan Development Network (AKDN) Diplomatic Luncheon. The event brought together representatives of various diplomatic missions in the UAE from more than 32 countries, along with representatives from numerous international agencies such as UNICEF, Fatima Bint Mohamed Bin Zayed Initiative, Mohammed Bin Rashid School of Government, Dubai Cares among others.

== See also ==
- Ismaili Centre
