= Aga Khan Park =

Public garden

Coordinates: 43.724770°N 79.332640°W

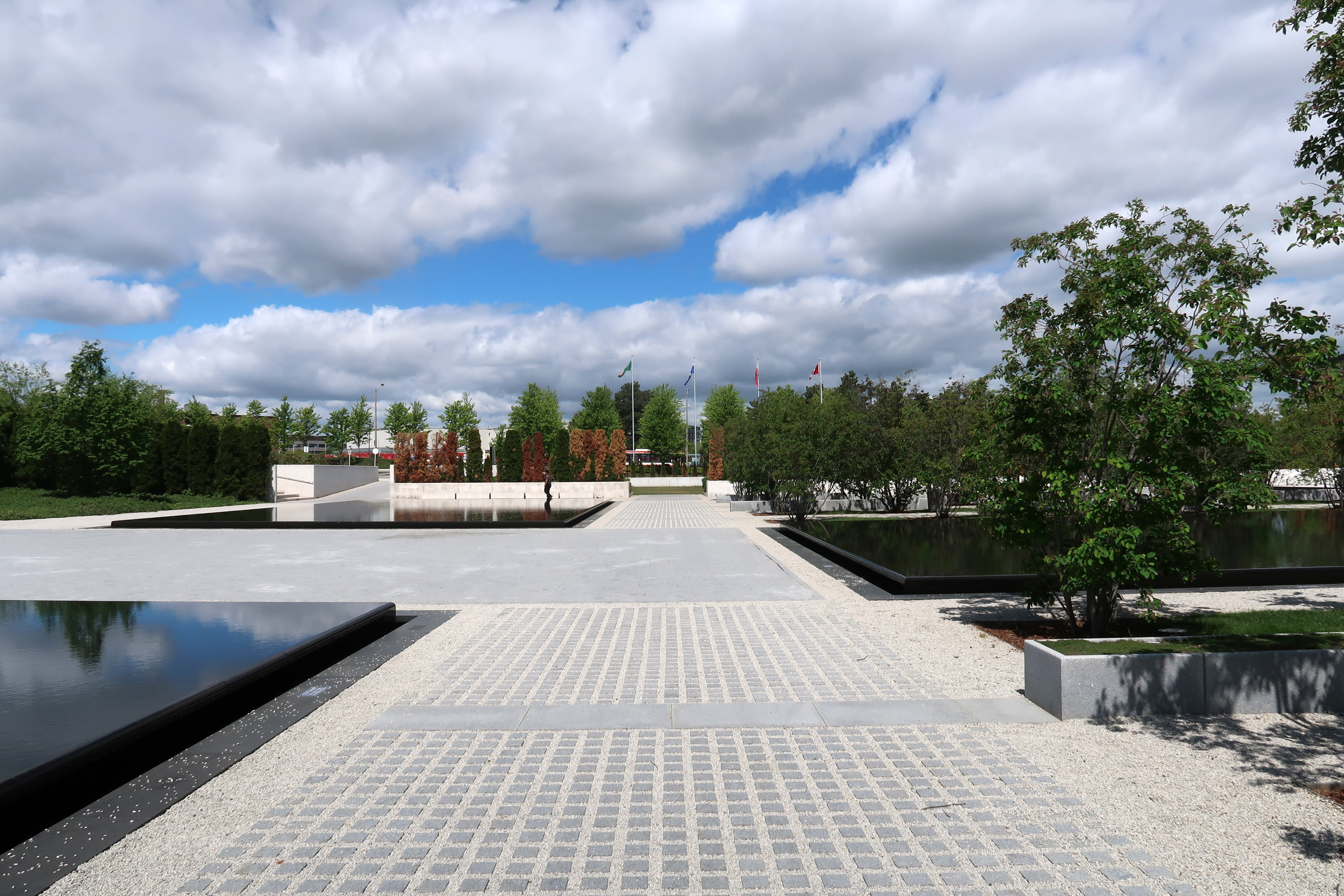
Aga Khan Park

The Aga Khan Park is a landscaped garden that covers the space between and around the Ismaili Centre and the Aga Khan Museum, located in Toronto, Ontario, Canada, built by Aga Khan IV and formally inaugurated by Ontario Premier Kathleen Wynne on 25 May 2015. The park is built on traditional Persian and Mughal style of architecture. The park was designed by the Beirut-based landscape architect Vladimir Djurovic. Prior to finalizing his designs, Djurovic visited multiple gardens around the world, such as the Tomb of Humayun in New Delhi, India. He settled down upon a more "what you feel and smell and hear" vibe in attempt to maintain harmony amongst spirit, art, and nature.
