= Ismaili Centre, Dushanbe =

The Ismaili Centre, Dushanbe
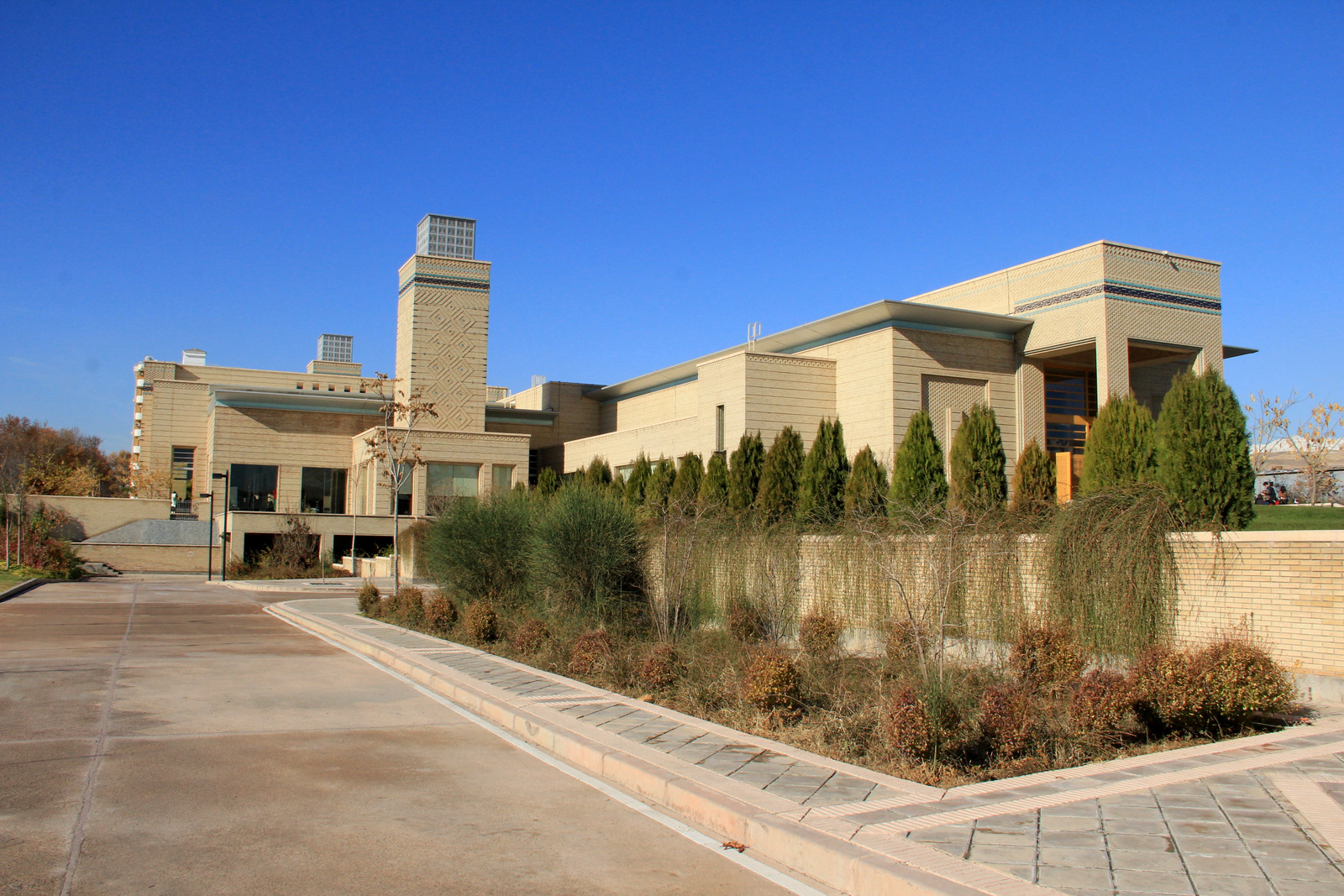

Religion
- Affiliation: Nizari Ismaili Muslim
- Leadership: His Highness the Aga Khan

Location
- Location: 47 Ismoil Somoni Avenue; 734000 Dushanbe, Tajikistan
- Interactive map of The Ismaili Centre, Dushanbe
- Coordinates: 38.58521°N 68.7634°E

Architecture
- Architects: Farouk Noormohamed Design Associates – Vancouver, Canada
- Type: Jamatkhana
- Groundbreaking: 30 August 2003
- Completed: 2009

Website
- https://the.ismaili/ismailicentres/dushanbe

The Ismaili Centre, Dushanbe (Tajik: Маркази исмоилия, romanized: Markazi ismoiliya, Russian: Исмаилитский центр, romanized: Ismailitskiy tsentr), is one of six Ismaili Centres worldwide and an Ismaili jamatkhana. It was the fifth purpose-built Ismaili Centre, and the first in Central Asia.

== Background ==
Dushanbe is the capital of Tajikistan, a country characterised by an unusually extensive Ismaili population for over a thousand years. The region of Badakhshan, which spills over northeastern Afghanistan, eastern Tajikistan and North Pakistan, is the only part of the world where Ismailis make up the majority of the population. Under Soviet rule, the religion was discouraged, but since 1991 has increased its public prominence, and the Personal Representative of the Ismaili imamate has been granted full diplomatic status. In May 1995, Aga Khan IV became the first Aga Khan known to have visited the region, invited by the governments of Tajikistan and Kyrgyz Republic.

== Function ==
The Centre is both representational of traditional architecture within the region, and ambassadorial through the social and educational programming offered.

Following extensive development work for Ismaili people in Tajikistan, the Centre was inaugurated on 12 October 2009 by the Aga Khan and the Tajikistani president, Emomali Rahmon (though as of 2013 not all of its planned functionality had been implemented). The Centre has given the traditionally peripheral Ismailis a prominent architectural focus in the capital city, while retaining the Ismaili Centres' customary sense of seclusion for those within the building, and is a mark of the increasing integration of Tajik Ismailis into the global Ismaili community. The Centre was designed 'to become part of the fabric of the civil life of the area', with the ambition of spiritual and intellectual advancement, and accordingly includes not only facilities for worship, but also for conferences, lectures and cultural performances (including translation booths, enabling simultaneous multilingual delivery of events) to encourage reciprocity in learning.

== Architecture ==
The site of the Centre is located on Ismoili Somoni Avenue, named in honour of Tajikistan’s national hero and founder of the early 10th century Samanid dynasty.

Designed by the Canadian architect Farouk Noormohamed, and like various post-independence Tajik buildings, the Ismaili Centre evokes Samanid architecture, its brickwork particularly evoking the Ismaili Samanid Mausoleum. The sandstone baked brick has been combined with woodcarvings, plaster work and visually prominent clay tiles accented in blue and turquoise glaze as an homage to the vernaculars of the 10th century mausoleum of the Samanids as well as the grand courtyards of Samarkand, Bukhara and Khiva. The floors are mostly characterized with patterned granite, and are made of beech, wenge and cherry wood. The design of the Centre embeds the aesthetic styles of the 12th century Karakhanid Mausoleum at Uzgen and 14th century Khwaja Ahmad Yasavi Mausoleum in Turkestan. The building is set within gardens featuring fountains and Persian silk trees.

The Centre is also notable for some of its sustainability features, such as earthquake-resistance and the use of an innovative water-source heating and cooling system. With Tajikistan being located in a highly seismic region, an elastic wood roof diaphragm has been installed to absorb structural stress. Water-source pumps and a heat recovery wheel have been installed for energy efficiency.
