= Aga Khan Museum =

Museum of Islamic art in Toronto, Canada

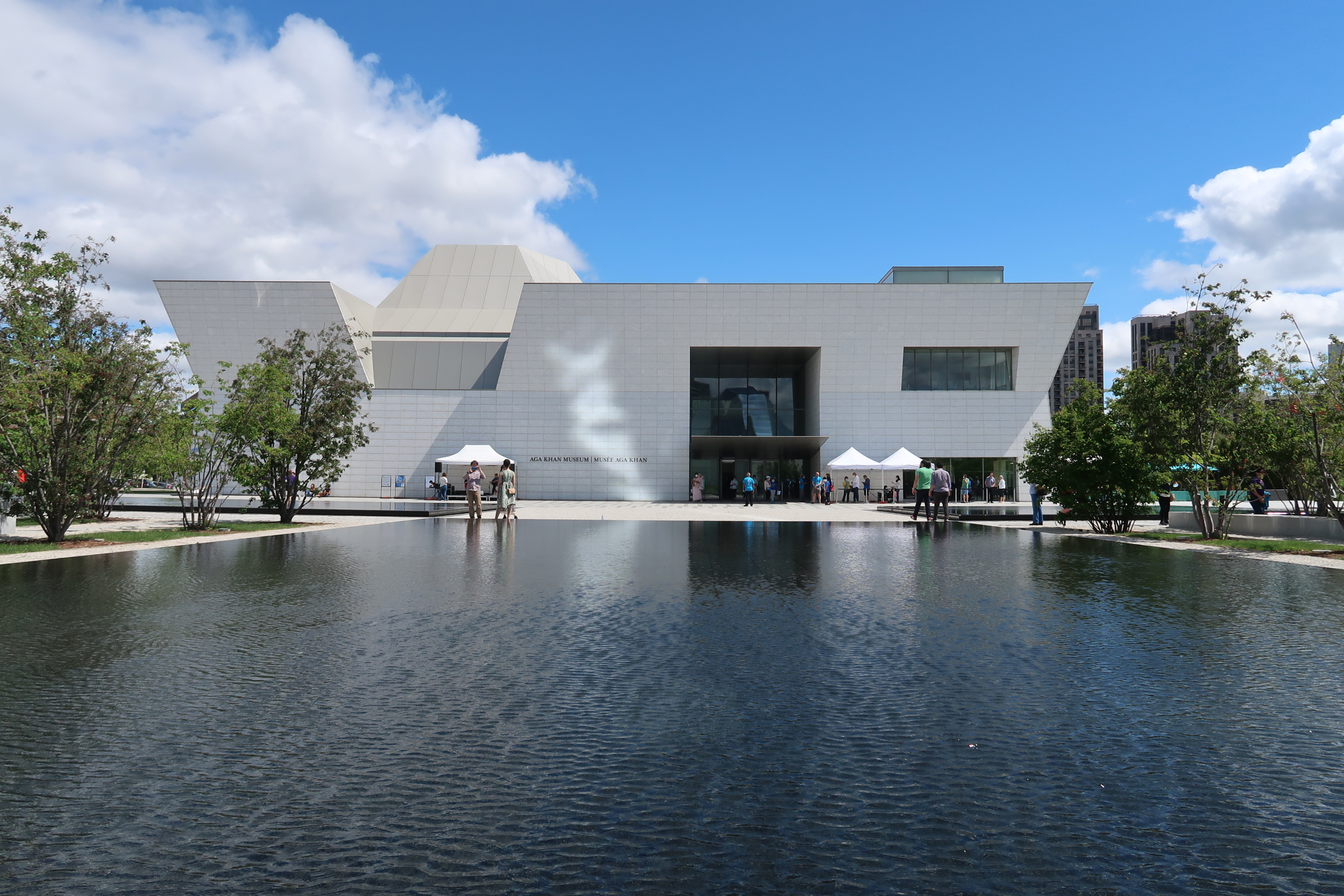
- Exterior view of the Aga Khan Museum

- Location of the museum in Toronto
- Established: September 18, 2014
- Location: 77 Wynford Drive; Toronto, Ontario, Canada
- Coordinates: 43°43′31″N 79°19′56″W
- Type: Muslim arts and culture
- Collection size: 1,000
- Director: Dr. Ulrike Al-Khamis
- Chairperson: Amyn Aga Khan
- Public transit access: 100; 34C; Aga Khan Park & Museum
- Website: www.agakhanmuseum.org

The Aga Khan Museum is a museum of Islamic art located in the North York district of Toronto, Ontario, Canada. The museum is dedicated to Islamic art and objects, and it houses approximately 1,200 rare objects assembled by Shah Karim al-Husayni and Prince Sadruddin Aga Khan. As an initiative of the Aga Khan Trust for Culture, an agency of the Aga Khan Development Network, the museum is dedicated to promoting understanding of Muslim cultures and their connection with other cultures through the arts. In addition to the Permanent Collection, the Aga Khan Museum features several temporary exhibitions each year that respond to current scholarship, emerging themes, and new artistic developments. The Museum Collection and exhibitions are complemented by educational programmes and performing arts events.

== History ==
=== Development and construction ===
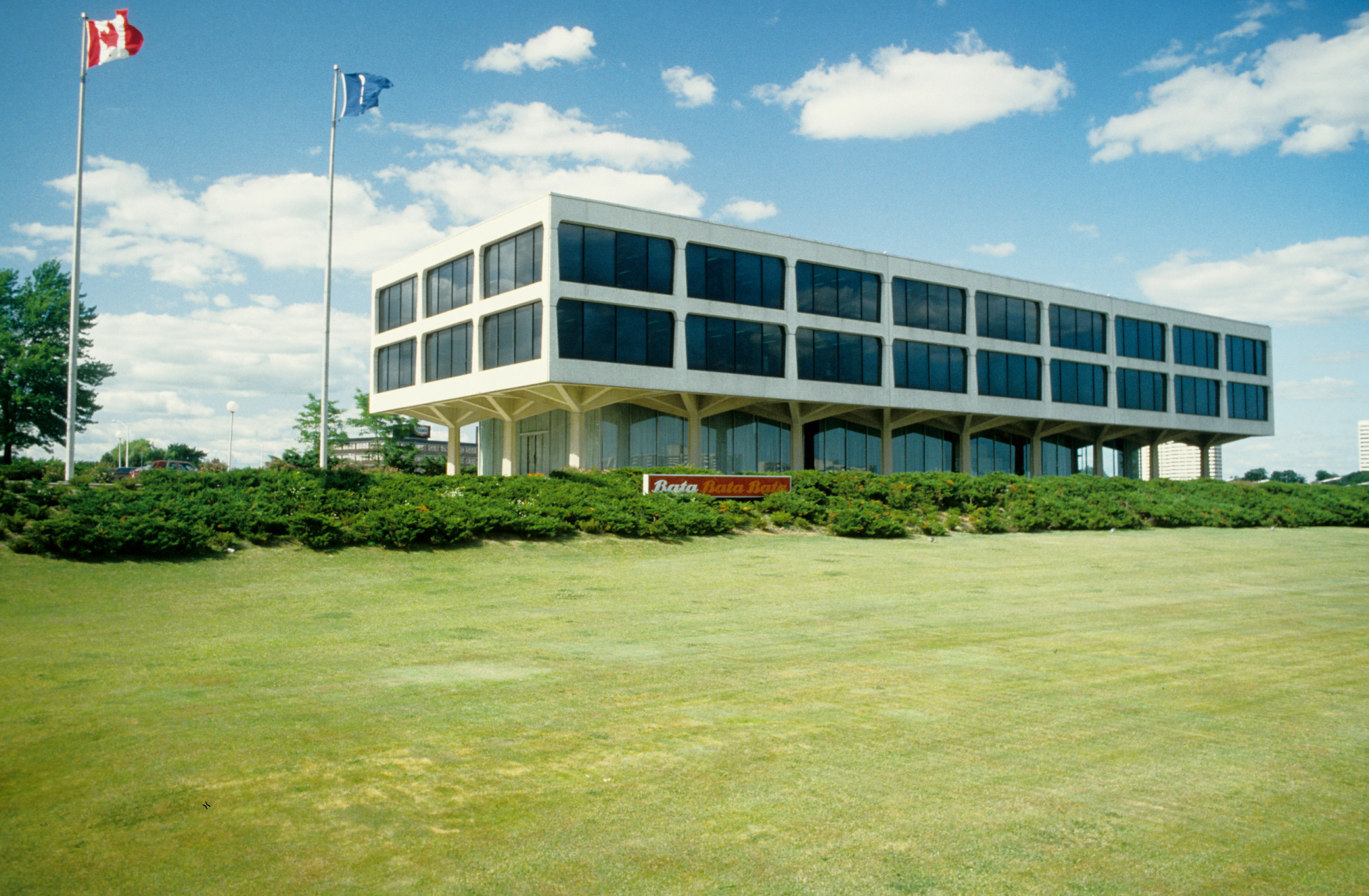
The Aga Khan Foundation purchased the Bata Shoes Head Office, in preparation for the museum's construction in 2002.

For many years the Aga Khan, spiritual leader of Shia Ismaili Muslims, was planning to build a major museum for Islamic art and artefacts that aligned with the Ismaili community's mission to offer new perspectives into Islamic civilizations by weaving together cross-cultural threads throughout history. The location in Don Mills, Toronto, Canada, was confirmed in 2002, after protests blocked a $60-million (Note: In Canadian dollars) offer for a site on the River Thames across from the British Houses of Parliament. The Aga Khan subsequently chose Canada as the location for the museum, citing the country's pluralism.

The Aga Khan bought the former Bata Shoes Head Office, a building that was adjacent to the Ismaili Centre, which was already under construction. Designed by modernist architect John B. Parkin, the building was demolished in 2007 after it was determined to be unsuitable for the museum. The new structure was designed by Pritzker Prize winner Fumihiko Maki. It also shares the 6.8-hectare space with public gardens created by Lebanese landscape architect Vladimir Djurovic.

The foundation-laying ceremony for the project was performed by Canadian Prime Minister Stephen Harper and the Aga Khan on May 28, 2010.

==== European tour ====
While a permanent home was being built for the collection, selected items went on tour in Europe. Exhibitions took place at the following institutions:

- Palazzo della Pilotta in Parma
- Ismaili Centre in London
- Louvre in Paris
- Calouste Gulbenkian Museum in Lisbon
- CaixaForum Madrid
- CaixaForum Barcelona
- Martin-Gropius-Bau in Berlin
- Sakıp Sabancı Museum in Istanbul
- The Hermitage in St. Petersburg

The exhibits received international acclaim. The exhibit conveys both Dīn and Dunya, which can be translated as 'Spirit' and 'Life'—the religious and secular aspects of life which are inextricably linked in Muslim cultures. The first exhibitions were organized in two parts: The Word of God consisting of sacred texts and related objects and The Power of the Sovereign reflecting Muslim courts and their figures. More recent exhibitions have been organized as The Word of God and The Route of the Travellers showing the geographic breadth of the Islamic world.

=== Opening ===
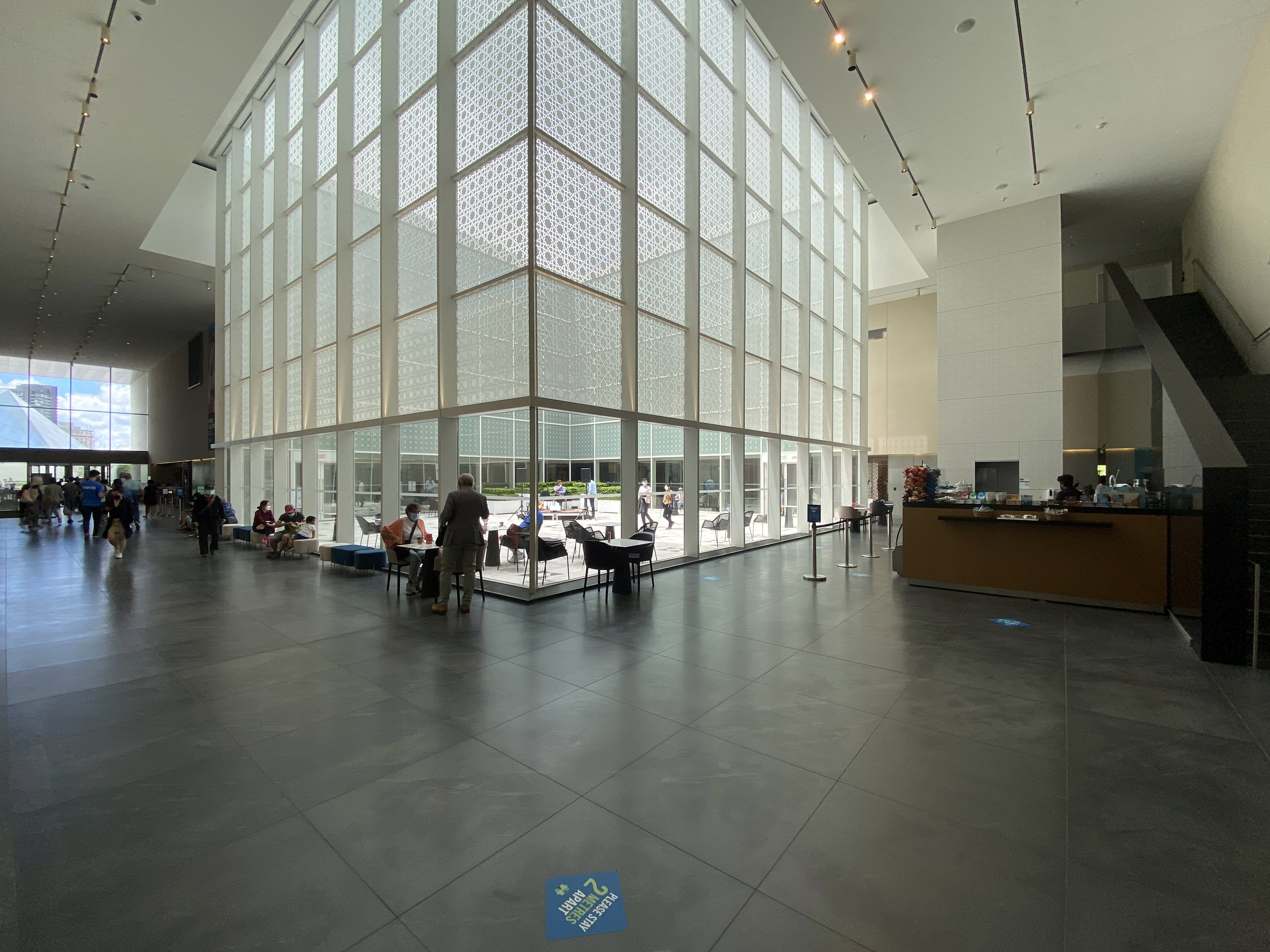
The museum's lobby in 2022

The Aga Khan Museum opened to the public on September 18, 2014. Michael Brand served as the museum's first director and CEO, followed by Henry Kim from 2012 to 2020. Prince Amyn Aga Khan was appointed the new chairman of the board effective May 18, 2016. The role was previously held by his brother, the Aga Khan.

In 2016, RGD InHouse Design presented the Award of Distinction to the Aga Khan Museum for the exhibition Home Ground: Contemporary Art from the Barjeel Art Foundation (July 25, 2015 – January 3, 2016).

The director of collections and public programs, Dr. Ulrike Al-Khamis, began her appointment on September 1, 2017. Dr. Al-Khamis was appointed director and CEO in 2021. In 2017, the Aga Khan Museum Shop also launched an online shopping platform. Most items online and onsite were commissioned exclusively for the Aga Khan Museum. In many instances, the items—jewellery, books, clothing, artwork, and more—are connected to the Aga Khan Museum's temporary exhibitions as well as its Permanent Collection.

The Aga Khan Museum was recognized as one of the best museums in Toronto by Conde Nast Traveller in 2018. In the same year, the Aga Khan Museum's exhibition, The World of the Fatimids, received a Global Fine Art Award in the Ancient Art (BC – 1200) category, and an honourable mention in the Global Humanity category for the 2017 exhibition, Skate Girls of Kabul. In June 2018, Sri Lankan-born chef Shen Ousmand launched a new menu at the Aga Khan Museum's restaurant Diwan. The McEwan Group, led by Chef Mark McEwan, has been at the helm of the museum's food services since 2016.

Opened in 2026, the Toronto Transit Commission's Eglinton Crosstown LRT has an Aga Khan Park & Museum stop.

== Architecture ==
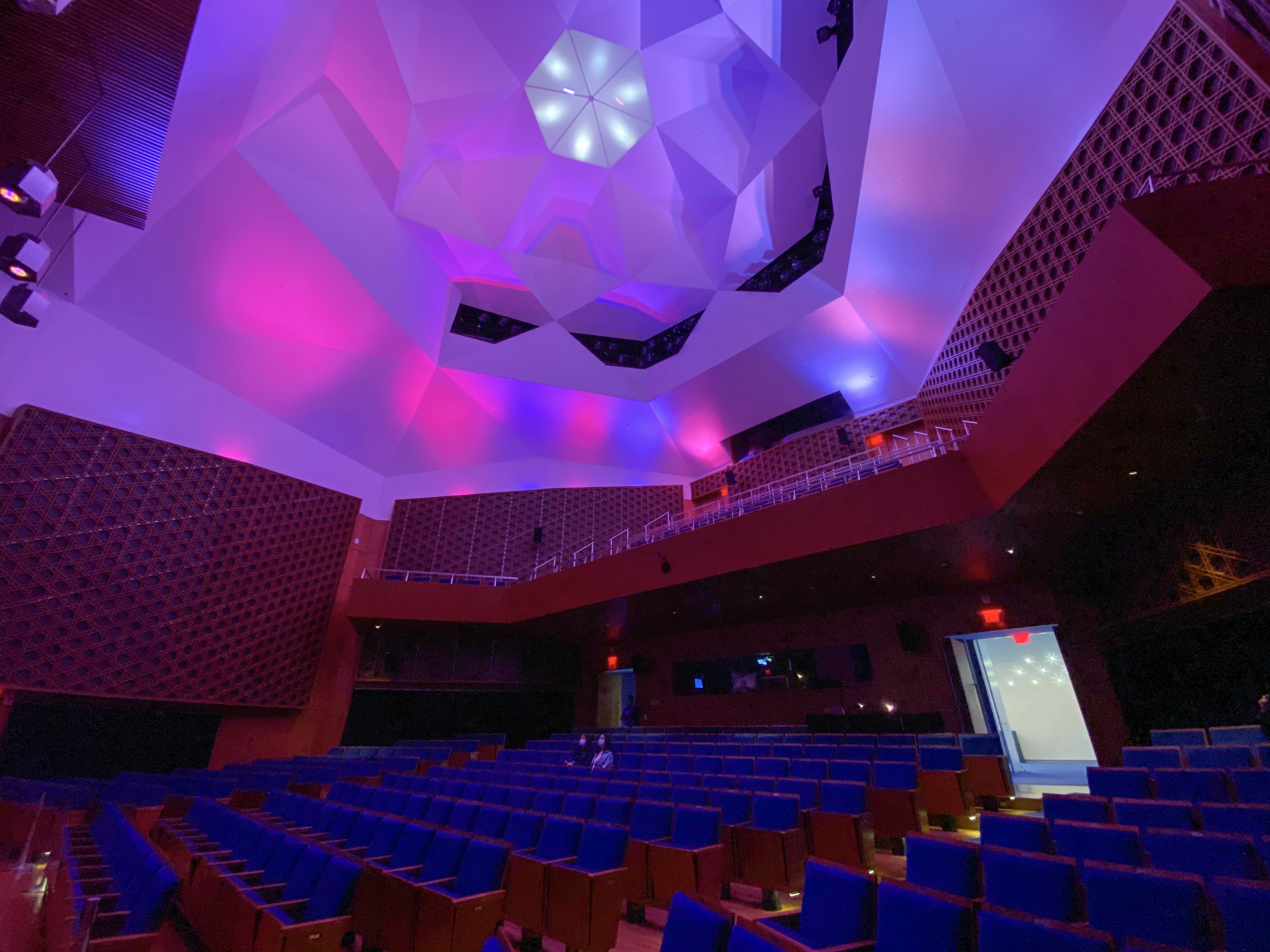
Auditorium ceiling

Designed by Pritzker Prize-winning architect Fumihiko Maki, the Aga Khan Museum shares a 6.8-hectare (17-acre) site with Toronto's Ismaili Centre, which was designed by Indian architect Charles Correa. The surrounding landscaped park was created by landscape architect Vladimir Djurovic and is a contemporary interpretation of the Islamic courtyard—the Charbaag.

The museum is home to galleries, exhibition spaces, classrooms, a reference library, an auditorium, and a restaurant. It houses a permanent collection of over 1,000 objects representing a broad range of artistic styles and materials from more than ten centuries of human history.

Commissioned by the Aga Khan, the museum building and surrounding spaces were designed to make use of natural light. The rectilinear building is oriented forty-five degrees to solar north where all its sides are exposed to the sun. The form has been chiseled to create a concaved angular profile that is also a natural expression of the two-level building. Clad in sandblasted white Brazilian granite, the surfaces of the building are set in motion in a constant interplay with the sun in light and deep shadows. The effect is similar to a sundial.

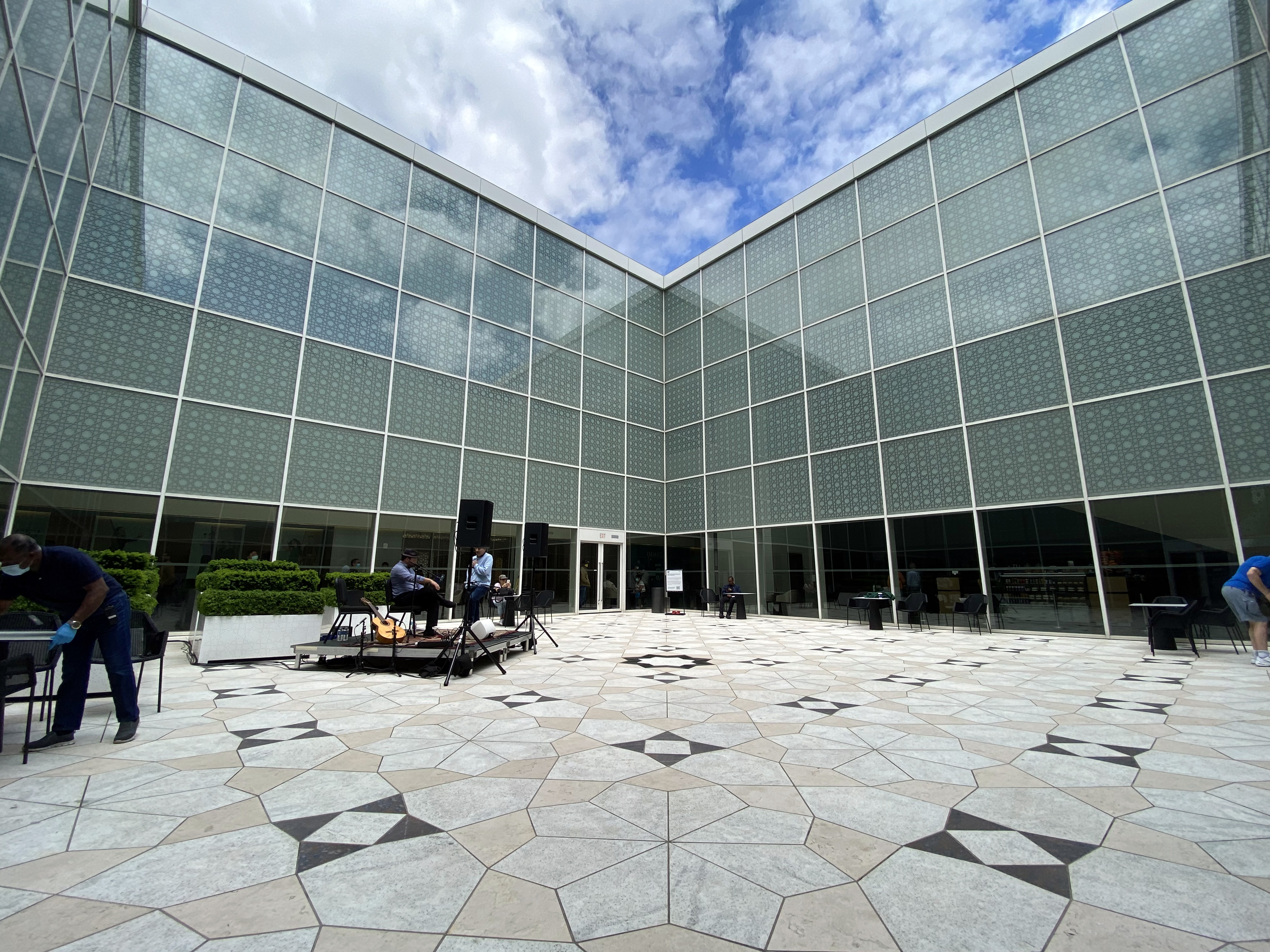
The interior courtyard of the museum is surrounded by glass walls imprinted with a pattern reminiscent of traditional Islamic Jali screens.

Within the building, there is a courtyard intended as a peaceful sanctuary. The courtyard's glass walls are imprinted with a double-layered pattern that creates a three-dimensional effect recalling the traditional Islamic Jali screens. The light from the courtyard moves patterned shadows on the soffits, walls and floor of the grand cloister. Up above on the second level, four large openings overlook the public spaces through a cast zinc screen in the form of a contemporary Musharabiya, an Islamic bay window. Within the galleries, large aluminium paneled skylights perforated with small hexagonal openings emit soft natural light into the exhibition areas.

== Collection ==
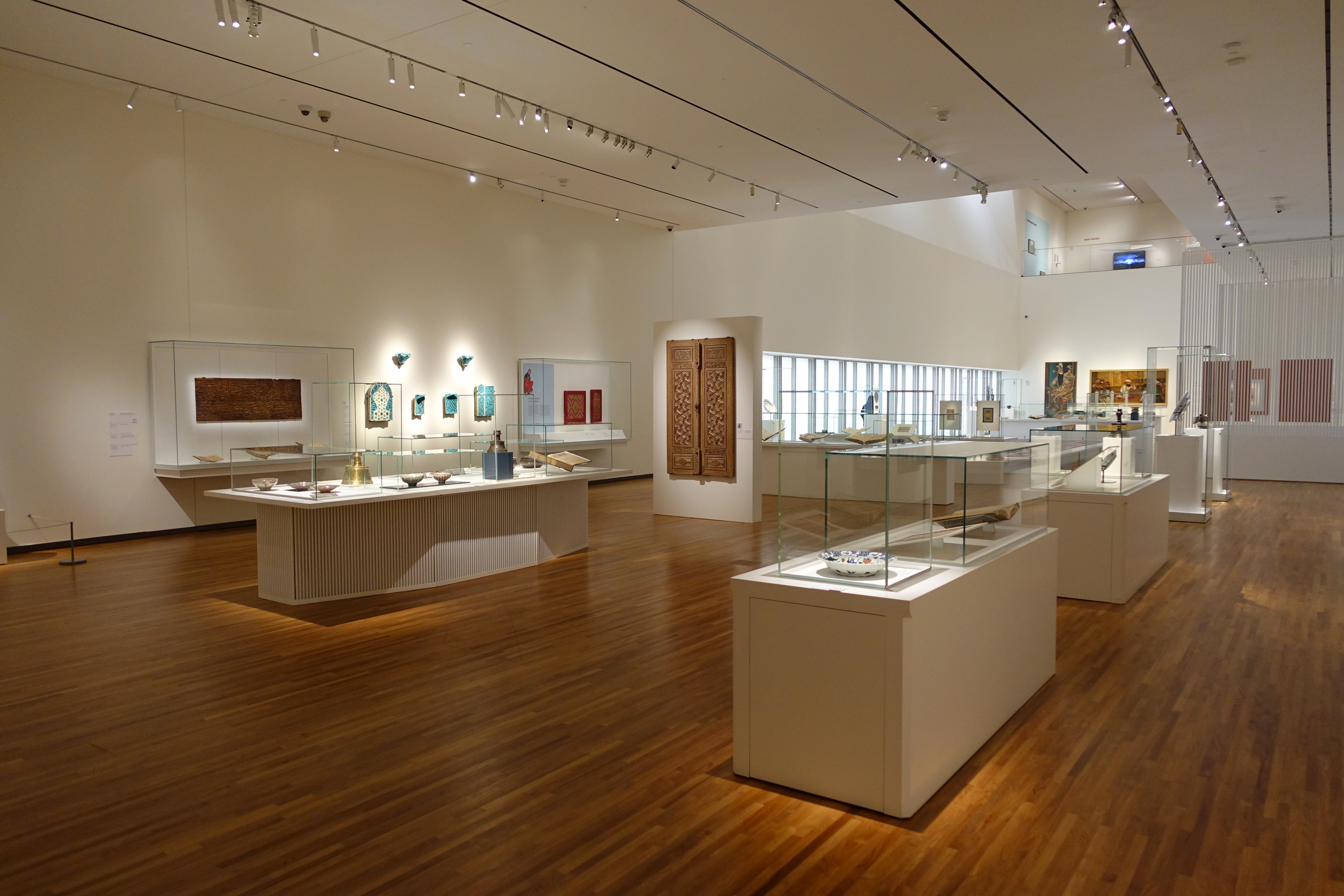
Works from the museum's collection are displayed in exhibits throughout the museum.

The Aga Khan Museum is dedicated to the acquisition, preservation, display and interpretation of artefacts relating to the intellectual, cultural, artistic and religious traditions of Muslim communities, past and present. Artefacts include ceramics, metalwork, and paintings covering all periods of Islamic history. Manuscripts in the collection include the earliest known copy of Avicenna's Qanun fi'l-Tibb ("The Canon of Medicine") dated 1052.

The museum will become a repository of historical materials related to the Ismaili community and house research programmes related to each one of the aspects of its institutional mission. It will also provide a space for permanent exchanges between the Islamic and the Western worlds on educational, cultural and socio-economic issues.

The collection, which comprises some 1,000 objects, includes several examples of Qur'an manuscripts that demonstrate the variety of script, media and decorative styles that evolved in the Muslim world. Among them, an eighth century North African folio demonstrates the earliest style of Kufic script written on parchment. A page from the well-known Blue Qur'an provides an example of gold kufic script on indigo-dyed parchment. The Blue Qur'an is a Qur'an manuscript of 9th–10th century North African origin; it was likely created for the Fatimid caliphs ruling from Qayrawan. And it was likely created for the Fatimid caliphs ruling from Qayrawan.

Located on the main floor of the museum, the Bellerive Room displays a selection from the ceramics collection of the late Prince Sadruddin Aga Khan and Princess Catherine Aga Khan. The room is a recreation of the "La Chambre Persane," or "Persian Salon," in their home, Château de Bellerive in Geneva, Switzerland, where part of the collection was originally on display. There are approximately 60 ceramic objects on view in the Bellerive room. They date from the early Islamic periods through to the 17th century. Their styles reflect the innovative technological and aesthetic contributions of Islamic potters through the ages, which were often in dialogue with influences from as far afield as China and Europe.

In 2018, Big Heech, by Iranian-Canadian sculptor Parviz Tanavoli, was installed at the museum entrance. The sculpture was a corporate donation in honour of the Aga Khan’s Diamond Jubilee.

== Selected temporary exhibitions ==
- Home Ground: Barjeel Art Foundation Modern Arab Art Collection (15 June 2015 – 3 January 2016)
- Abbas Kiarostami: Doors Without Keys (November 21, 2015 – March 28, 2016)
- Syria: A Living History (October 15, 2016 – February 26, 2017)
- Rebel, Jester, Mystic, Poet: Contemporary Persians (February 4, 2017 – June 4, 2017)
- Syrian Symphony: New Compositions in Sight and Sound (May 20, 2017 – August 13, 2017)
- Here: Locating Contemporary Canadian Artists (July 22, 2017 – January 7, 2018)
- The World of the Fatimids (March 10, 2018 – July 2, 2018)
- The Moon: Voyage Through Time (March 9, 2019 – August 18, 2019)
- Caravans of Gold, Fragments in Time: Art, Culture, and Exchange Across Medieval Saharan Africa (September 21, 2019 – February 23, 2020)
- Don't Ask Me Where I'm From (February 25, 2020 – October 11, 2020)
- Sanctuary (March 21, 2020 – October 25, 2020)
- 50 Years of Migration (January 24, 2023 – February 12, 2023)
- Rumi (May 13, 2023 – October 1, 2023)
- Cultured Pallets (May 2, 2023 – November 5, 2023)

The exhibition titled 'Don't Ask Me Where I'm From' is in partnership with Fondazione Imago Mundi. The project channels the experiences of artists who are first, second, and third-generation immigrants–a growing body of people raised in a culture other than their parents–in a series of several works exploring cross-cultural artistic realities.

The exhibition titled 'Sanctuary' showcases immigrants' experience using rugs as a medium to share narratives to demonstrate stories, histories, place, and purpose. The exhibition comprises the work of thirty-six artists from twenty-two countries creating rug designs. The designs were woven into the rugs by artisans in Lahore, using traditional techniques to create each piece of art. Artists of this exhibition include Ai Wei Wei.

The exhibition titled ’50 Years of Migration' commemorates over 50 years of immigration of Shi’a Imami Ismaili Muslims to Canada, the people for which His Highness the Aga Khan serves as spiritual leader. The travelling exhibition integrates family photographs, first-hand accounts, historical documents, and personal interviews that "showcase the courage and resilience of the countless Ismaili Muslims who fled their homelands in search of refuge." With stories of Canadian Ismailis from Uganda, Afghanistan, Syria, Tajikistan, India, Pakistan and elsewhere, it is presented by the Aga Khan Council for Canada in collaboration with award-winning Canadian artist Aquil Virani.

== In popular culture ==
- The museum appeared in the Star Trek: Discovery episode "Lethe", where it was used as a filming location for scenes on the planet Vulcan.
- The scientific conference in the 2017 American science fiction comedy film Downsizing was filmed at the museum.
- The museum appeared in the 2022 American comedy action film The Man from Toronto.

== See also ==
- Aga Khan Park
- The Ismaili Centre, Toronto
- Aga Khan Trust for Culture
- Aga Khan Development Network
- List of Islamic art museums
- List of museums in Toronto
