= Ismaili Centre =

Nizari Isma'ilism community buildings

The Ismaili Centres are symbolic markers of the permanent presence of the Nizari Ismailis in the countries and regions in which they are established, characterised by the Aga Khan IV as 'ambassadorial buildings'. Each building is architecturally unique and functions as a jamatkhana (place of worship), but also incorporates spaces for social and cultural gatherings, intellectual engagement and reflection, as well as spiritual contemplation. They facilitate mutual exchange and seek to foster understanding between diverse peoples, communities and faiths. Collectively and individually, the Centres represent the Nizari Ismaili community’s intellectual and spiritual understanding of Islam, as well as the community’s social conscience, outlook and attitude towards the societies in which it lives.

== Locations ==
Ismaili Centres have been established in London (1985), Vancouver (1985), Lisbon (1998), Dubai (2008), Dushanbe (2009), Toronto (2014), and Houston (2025).

Ismaili centres
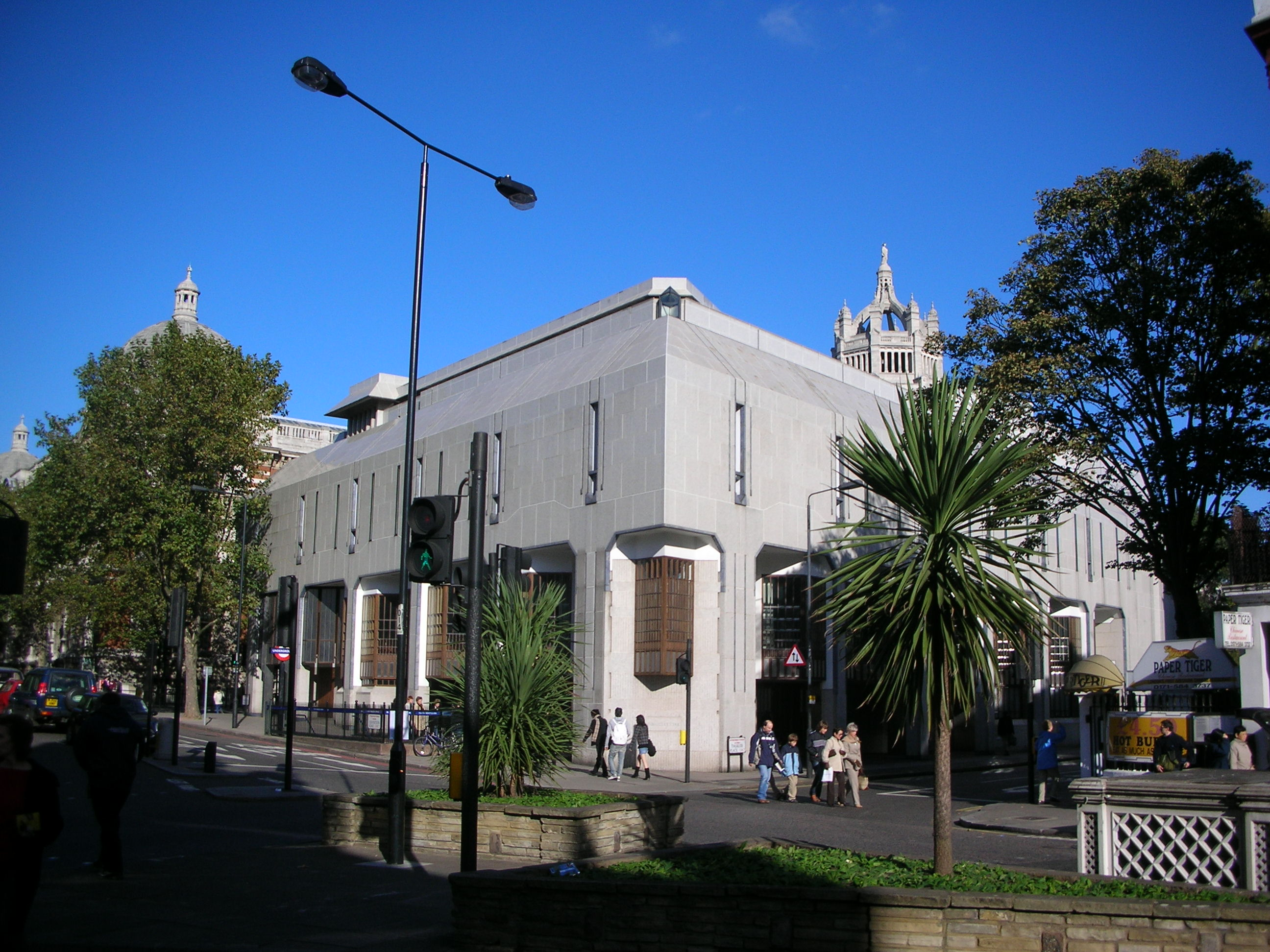
Ismaili Centre, London

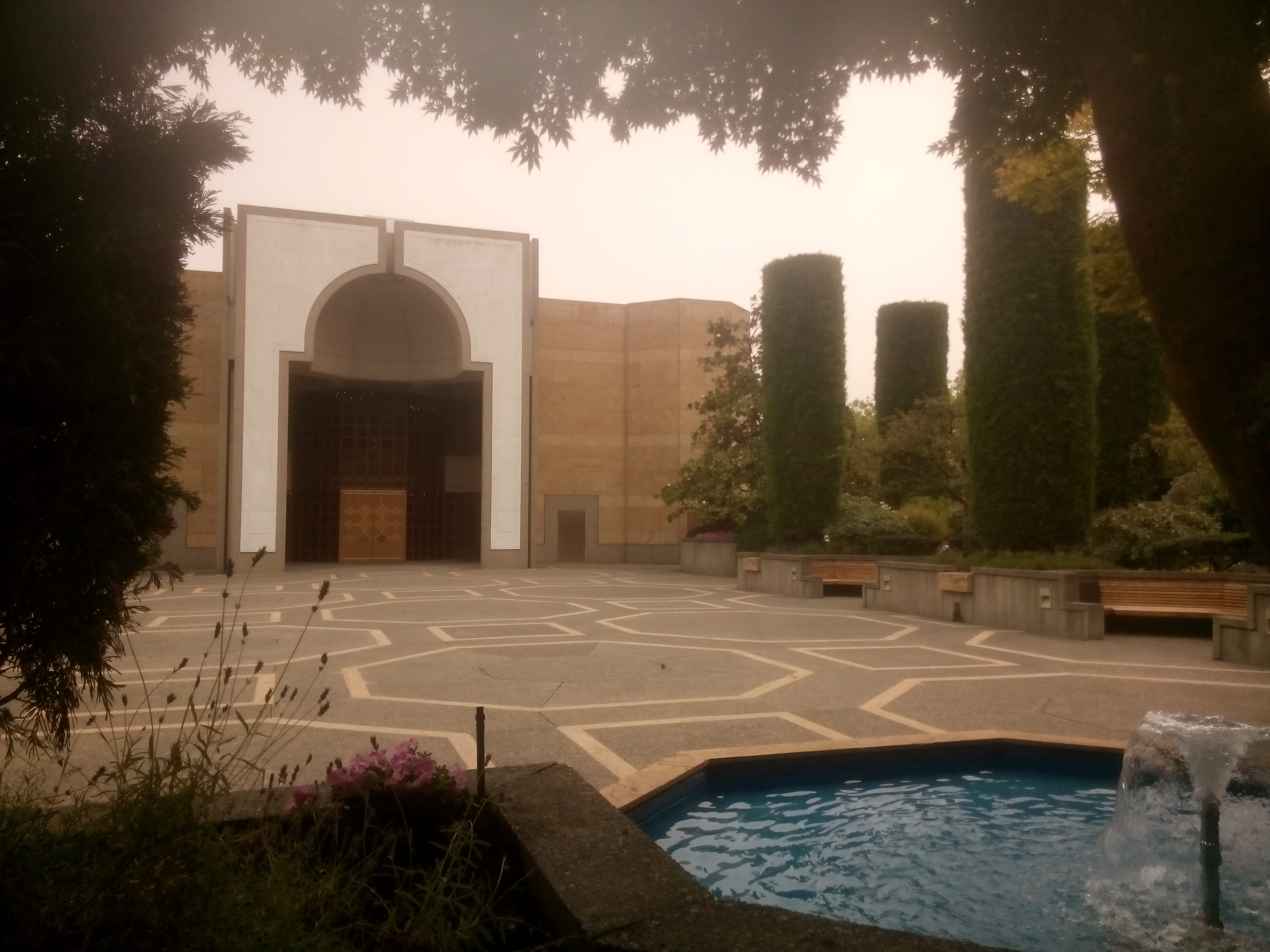
Ismaili Centre, Vancouver

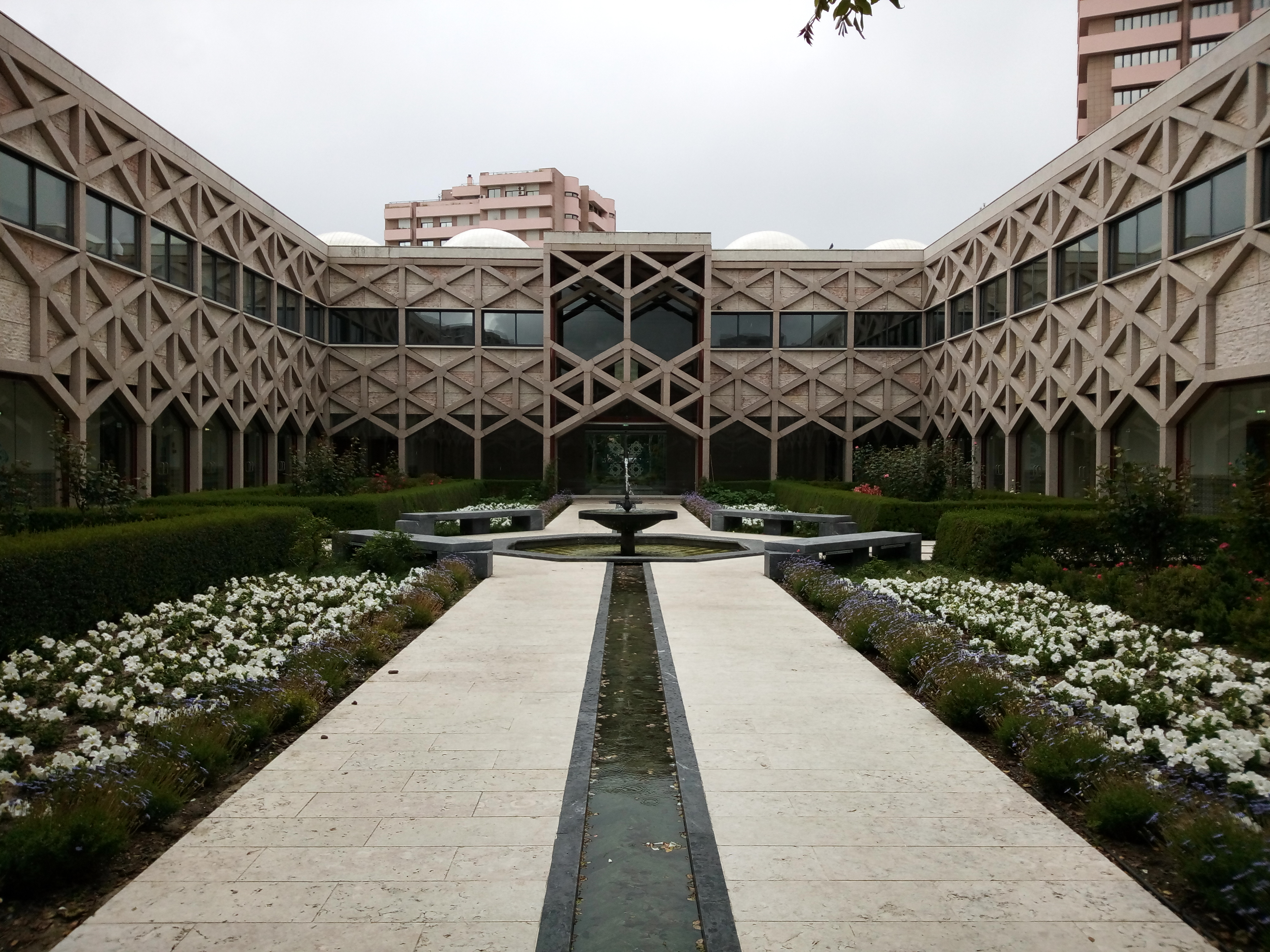
Ismaili Centre, Lisbon

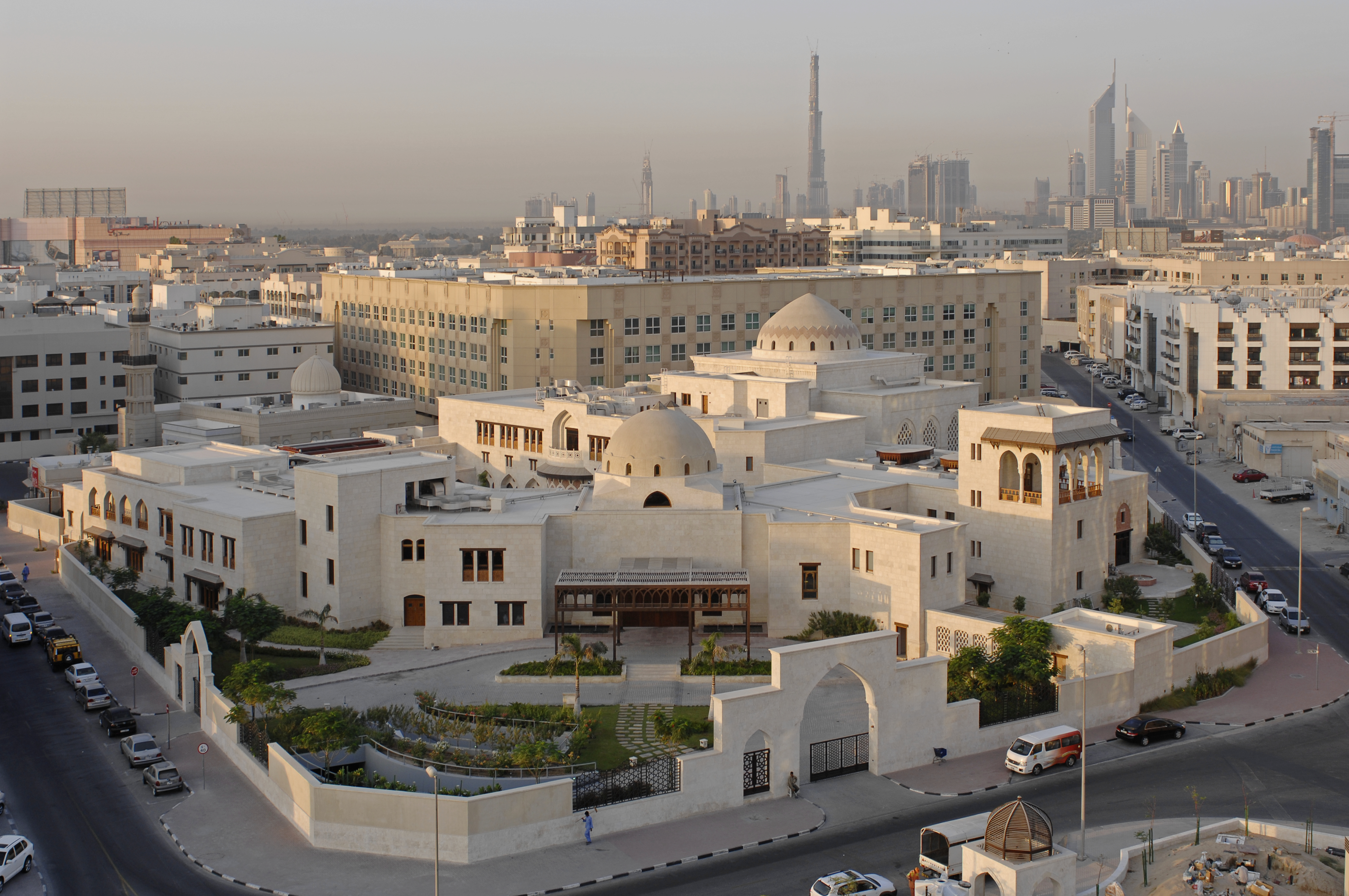
Ismaili Centre, Dubai

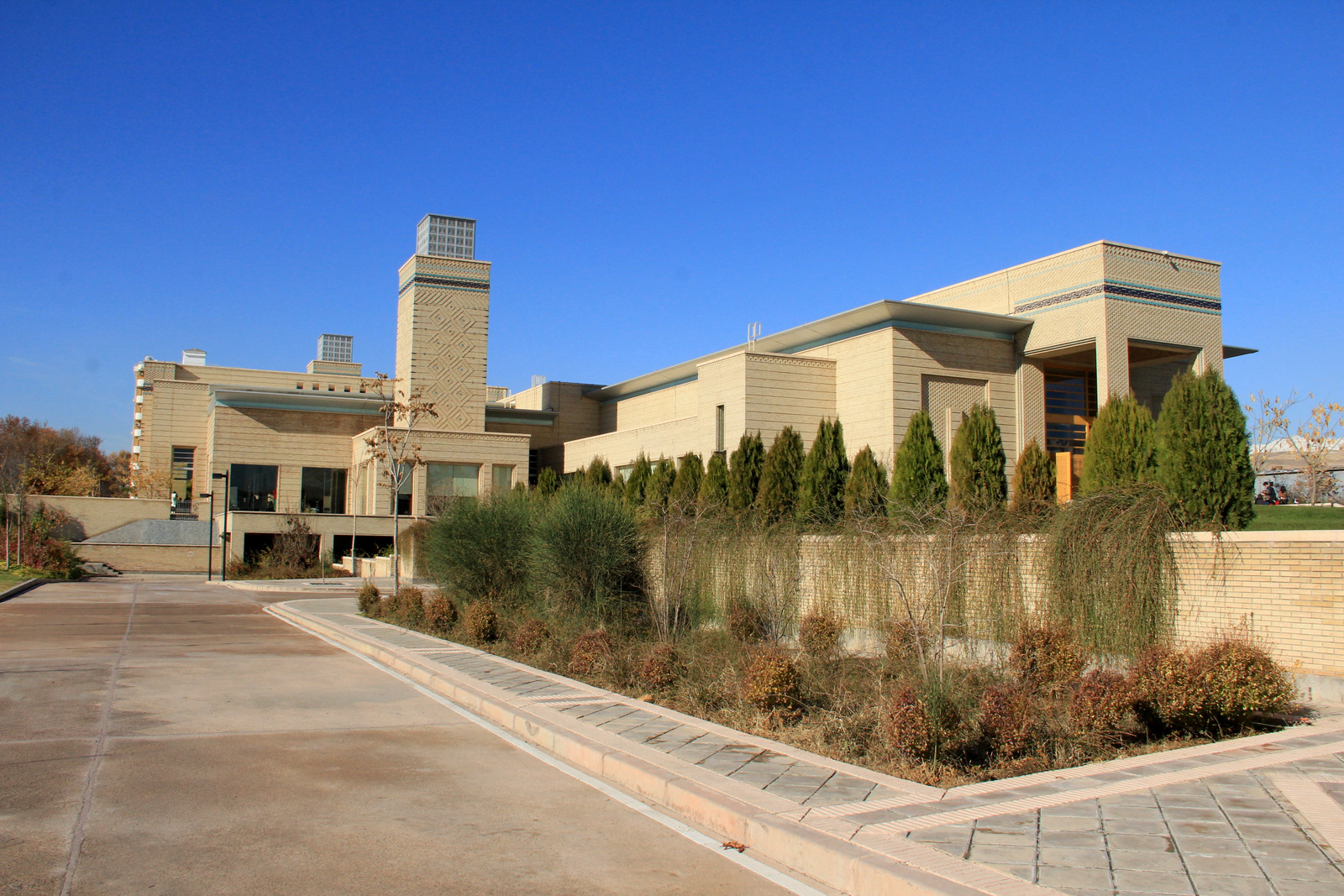
Ismaili Centre, Dushanbe

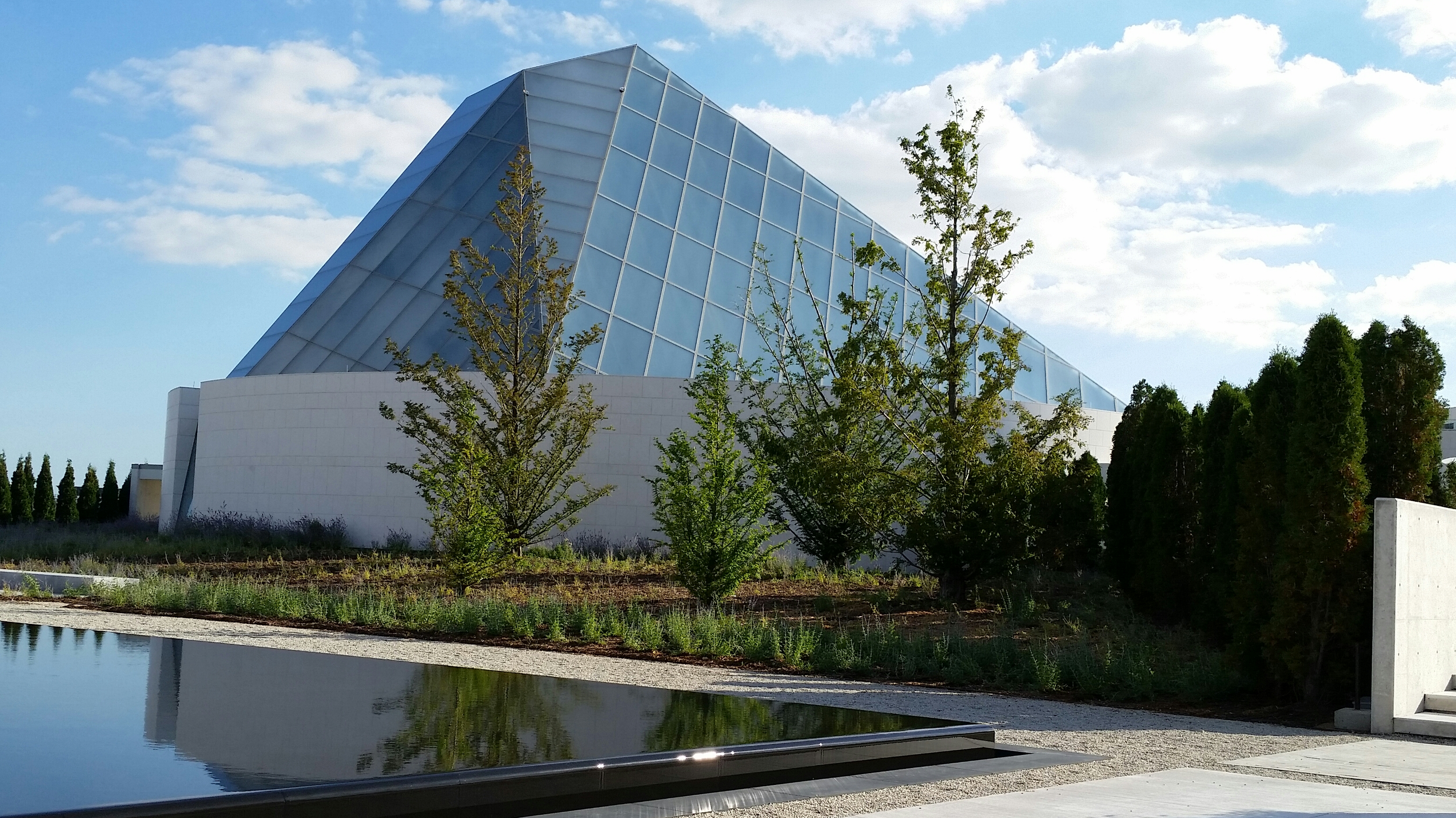
Ismaili Centre, Toronto
