= Ismaili Centre, Vancouver =

Ismaili center in British Columbia, Canada

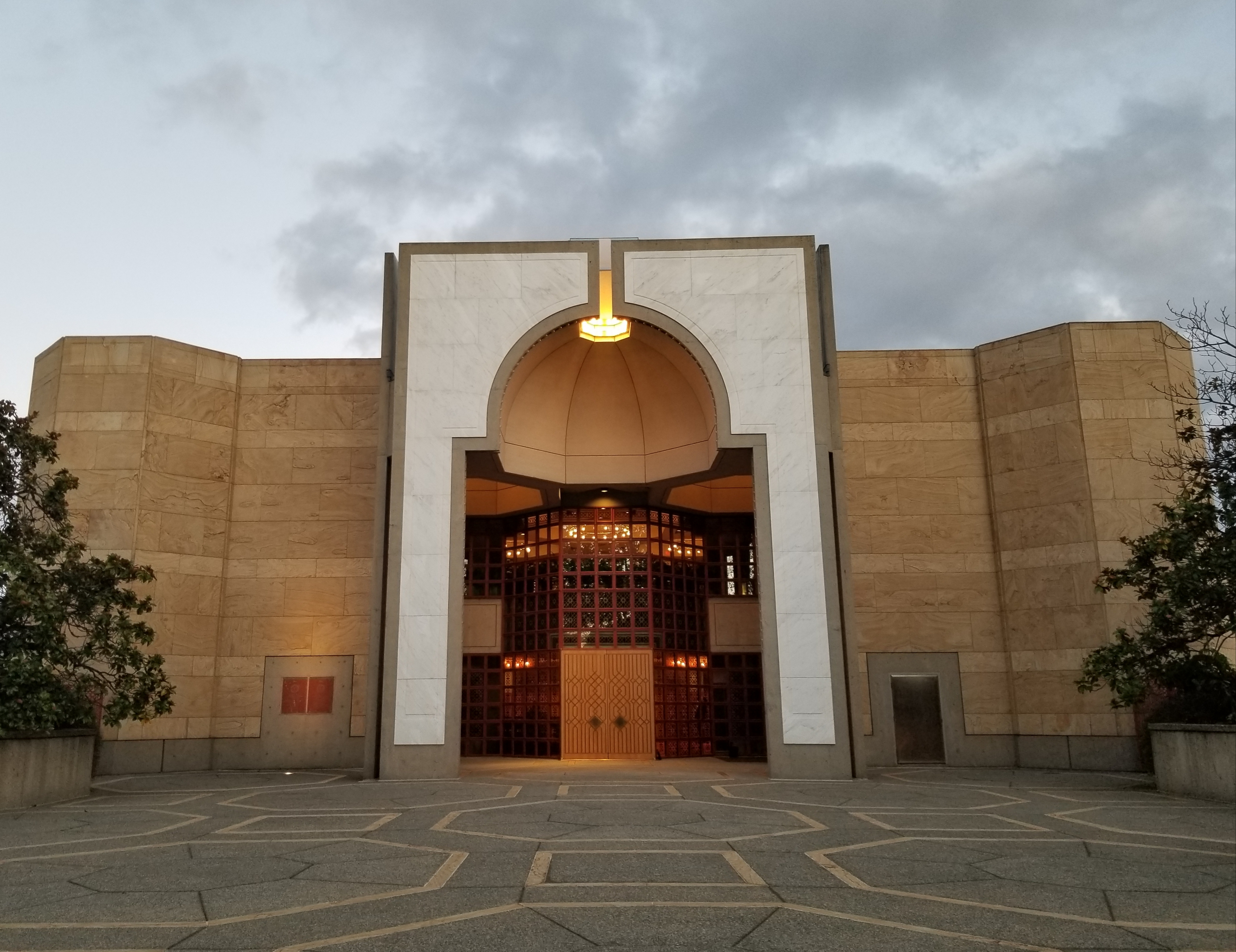

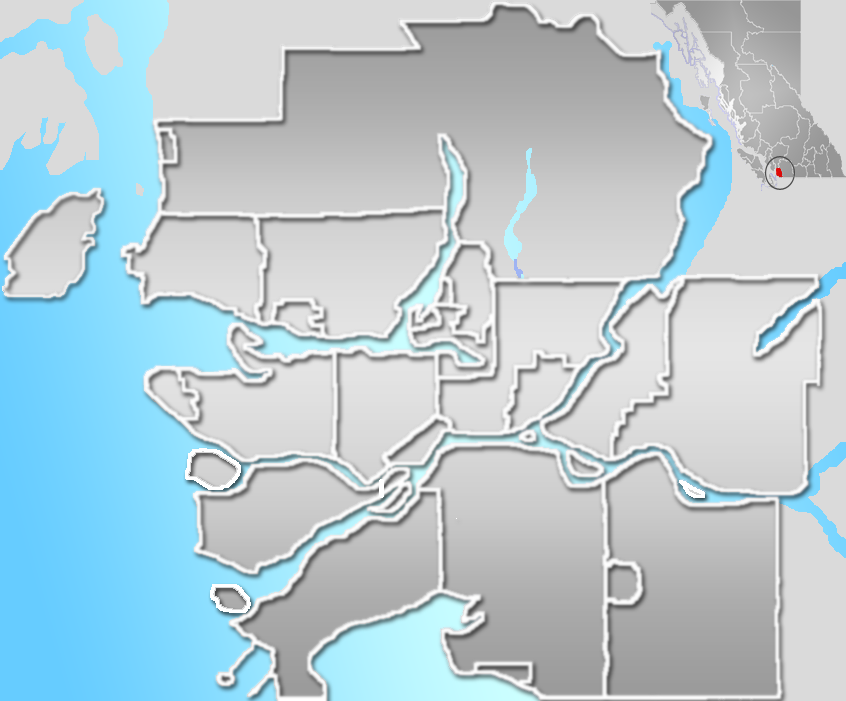
- Location in Greater Vancouver

Religion
- Affiliation: Shia Islam
- Rite: Nizari Ismaili
- Ecclesiastical or organisational status: Jama'at Khana
- Status: Active

Location
- Location: 4010 Canada Way, Burnaby, British Columbia
- Country: Canada
- Coordinates: 49°15′15″N 123°00′49″W

Architecture
- Architect: Bruno Freschi
- Type: Jamatkhana
- Style: Islamic architecture
- Founder: His Highness the Aga Khan
- Groundbreaking: 26 July 1982
- Completed: 1985

Specifications
- Interior area: 3,780 m^{2} (40,700 sq ft)
- Dome: Two (maybe more)
- Materials: Stone

Website
- the.ismaili/ismaili-centre-vancouver

The Ismaili Centre, Vancouver is an Ismaili Jama'at Khana, located in the Vancouver suburb of Burnaby, in British Columbia, Canada. Completed in 1985, it is one of six Ismaili Centres worldwide. and was the first purpose-built jamatkhana and Ismaili centre in North America. The centre has been the subject of sustained, dedicated academic analysis, and presented as a case study of modern Islamic architecture in the West.

== Foundation and establishment ==
Established by His Highness Aga Khan IV, the 49th hereditary Imam of the Shia Ismaili Muslims, the Ismaili Centre, Vancouver was the first of such centers in North America and the second in a series of six Ismaili Centres currently situated in London, Lisbon, Dubai, Dushanbe, and Toronto.

The foundation ceremony for the new building was held on 26 July 1982, and construction was completed in 1985. During the silver jubilee of His Highness the Aga Khan, the new building was opened by the former Canadian Prime Minister Brian Mulroney on 23 August 1985.

== Architecture and design ==
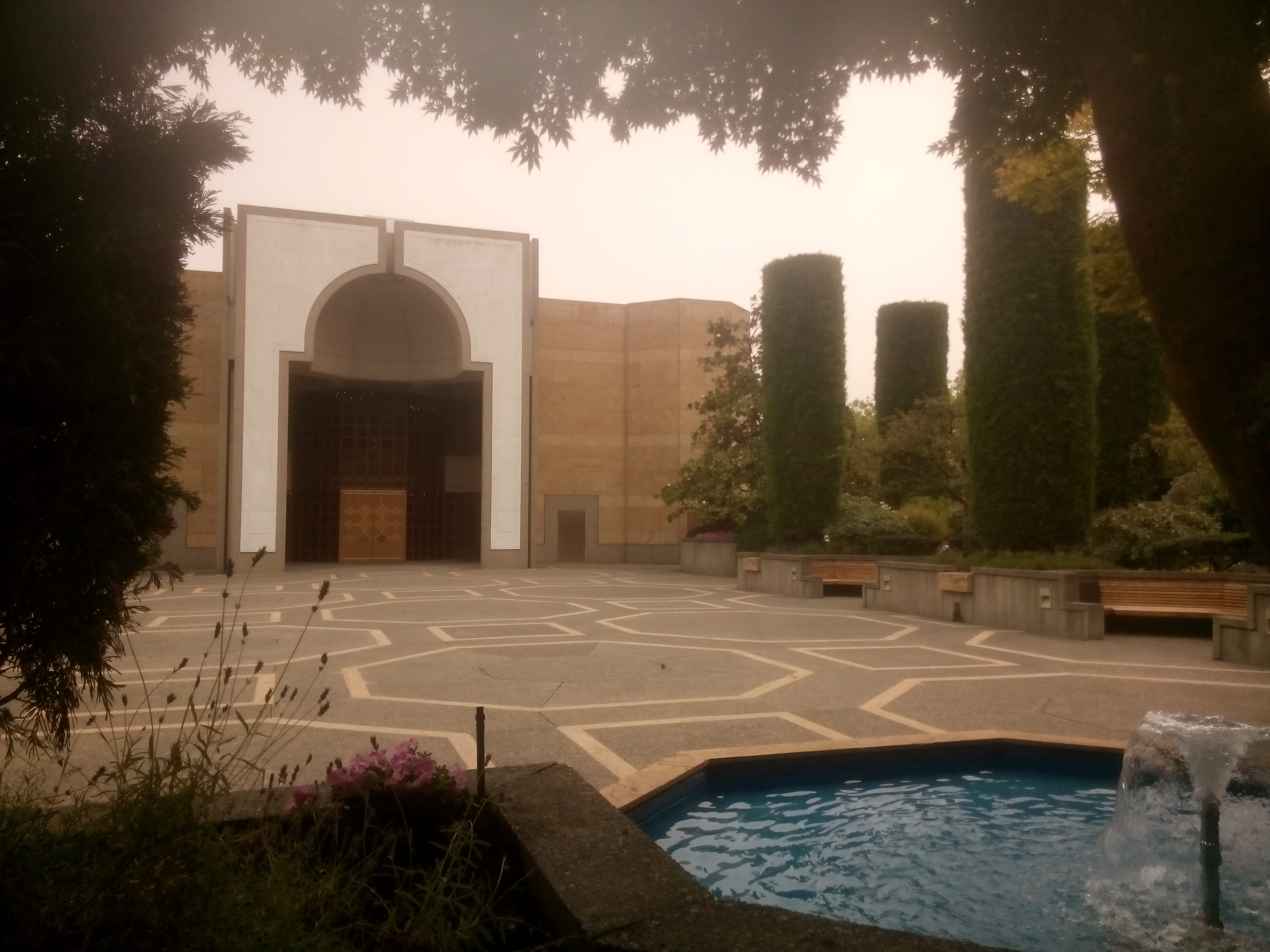
The entrance and forecourt, in 2017

Designed by the Vancouver architect Bruno Freschi, the building was conceived as an 'ambassadorial building' aiming to give visual architectural expression to the expanding Ismaili community in Canada, and designed 'not just for the use of the members of the Ismaili community, but [...] to become part of the fabric of the civil life of the area'. The centre has been described as 'monumental', 'spectacular' and 'sitting harmoniously' within its environment, reflecting 'traditional Islamic architectural vocabulary in modern context, materials, and craftsmanship'. Its footprint is 3,870 square metres (41,700 sq ft), with a basement containing offices and classroom space, and two upper floors, a double-height prayer-hall (reserved for Ismaili worship) and a multi-purpose hall, around a courtyard with a fountain. The prayer-hall is roofed with a series of shallow Turkish-style domes. The design 'attracted international plaudits'.

== See also ==
- Ismaili Centre
- Islam in Canada
- List of mosques in Canada
