= Ismaili Centre, Lisbon =

Shia Ismaili center in Lisbon, Portugal

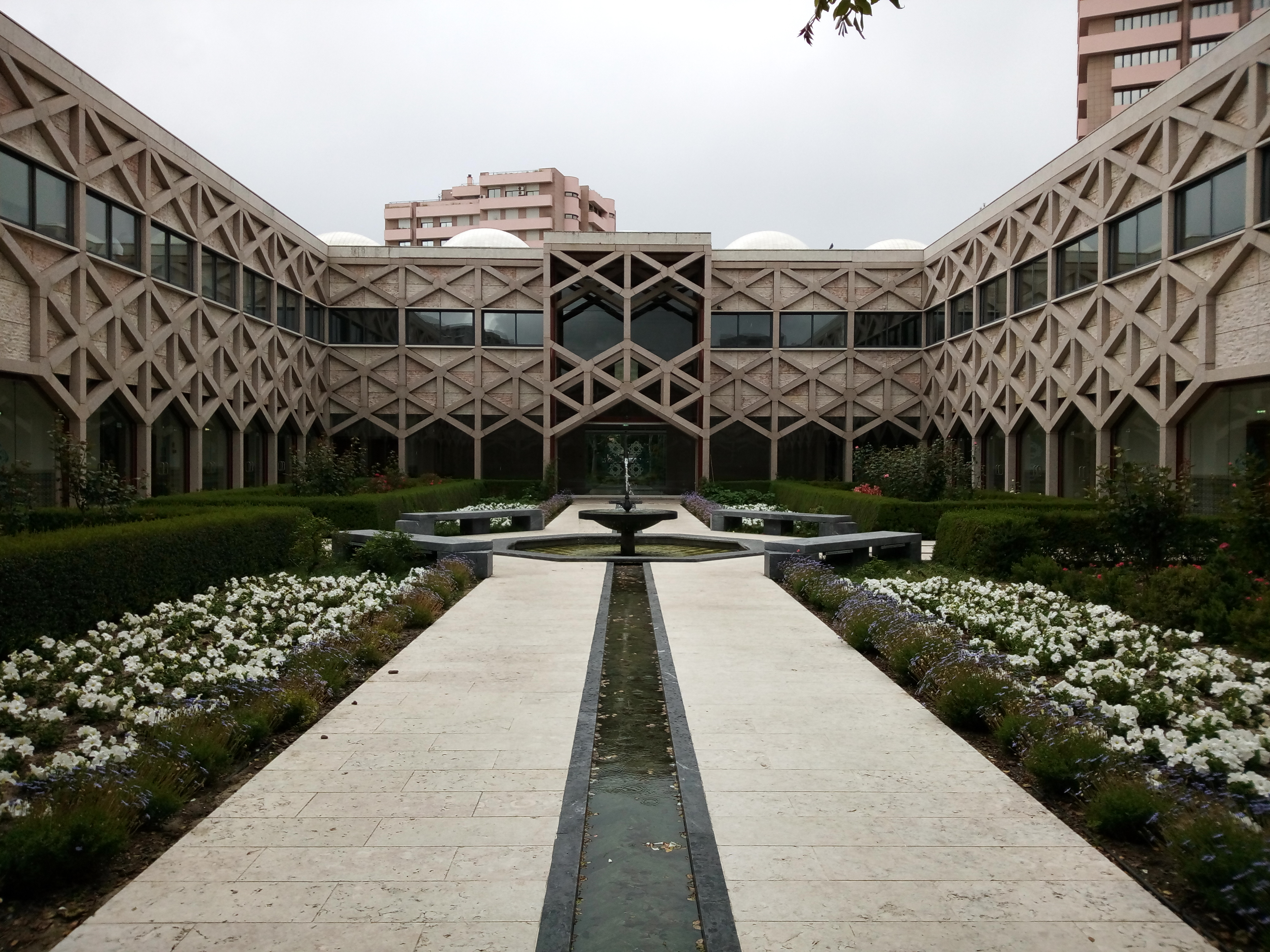
- Main courtyard of the Ismaili Centre, Lisbon

- Location of the mosque in Lisbon

Religion
- Affiliation: Shia Islam
- Rite: Nizari Ismaili Muslim
- Ecclesiastical or organizational status: Mosque
- Patron: His Highness the Aga Khan
- Status: Active

Location
- Location: Lisbon
- Country: Portugal
- Interactive map of Ismaili Centre, Lisbon

Architecture
- Architects: Raj Rewal; Frederico Valsassina
- Type: Islamic architecture
- Groundbreaking: December 1996
- Completed: 1998
- Site area: 18,000 m^{2} (190,000 sq ft)

Website
- the.ismaili/ismaili-centre-lisbon

The Ismaili Centre, Lisbon, is one of six Ismaili Centres worldwide. Established in the Palma de Baixo area of Lisbon in 1998, it is a religious, social and cultural meeting place for the Shi'ite Ismaili Muslim community in Portugal.

== Establishment ==
In December 1996, Portuguese President Jorge Sampaio laid the foundation stone of the Ismaili Centre, and on 11 July 1998 it was officially opened by President Sampaio and His Highness the Aga Khan.

The Ismaili community in Portugal has grown since the 1970s, necessitating the need for this new, permanent marker of their presence in Portugal.

On July 13, 2023, the Portuguese President Marcelo Rebelo de Sousa awarded the Portuguese Order of Merit to the Ismaili Centre, Lisbon.

== Architecture ==
The Ismaili Centre, Lisbon is a distinct architectural complex on a 18,000-square-metre (190,000 sq ft) site, that contains 12,000 square metres (130,000 sq ft) of gardens and patios. The main religious and meeting space of the local Ismaili Muslim community is located in the lioz stone and glass building located in the Laranjeiras neighbourhood.

The site was developed following an international competition resulting in the selection of architect Raj Rewal. He was later joined by the office of the Portuguese architect, Frederico Valsassina. The landscaping was entrusted to PROAP.

The Ismaili Centre takes inspiration from the philosophy and traditions of Eastern Islamic architecture, combined with those from the Iberian Peninsula. The principles are highlighted in the composition of space, in the numerous courtyards and fountains, in the stonework and the metal gates and in the Mediterranean flora. The design is influenced by an amalgamation of traditional spatial arrangements of courtyards, such as those in the Alhambra and Fatehpur Sikri, as well as Islamic patterns.

Fountains, running water and foliage form the landscaping of the six courtyards and external spaces.

== Ethos and purpose ==
The Ismaili Centres are an example of such spaces of gathering and are symbolic of the permanently present core Ismaili values and traditions.

Since its establishment in 1998, the Ismaili Centre, Lisbon has hosted public exhibitions, lectures, and musical programs.

== 2023 stabbings ==
On the morning of 28 March 2023, two Portuguese women belonging to the staff of the Ismaili Muslim Centre in Lisbon were stabbed to death by an Afghan refugee who was taking Portuguese language classes at the centre.
