= Jami Mosque (Toronto) =

Mosque in Toronto, Ontario, Canada

- Arabic: مسجد جامع
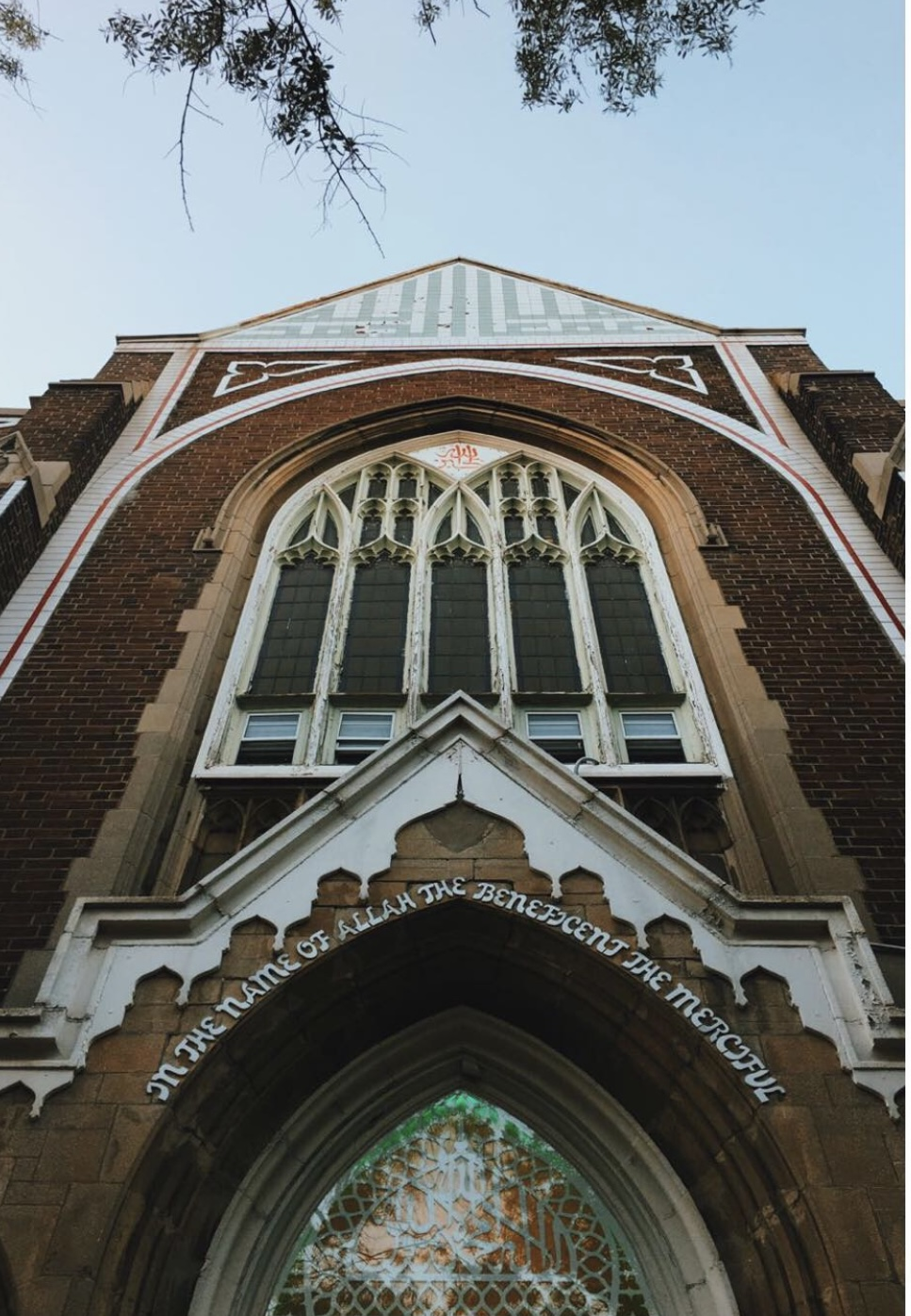
- The entrance of Jami Mosque

- Location in Toronto

Religion
- Affiliation: Islam
- Ecclesiastical or organisational status: Church (1930–1960s); Mosque (since 1969)
- Leadership: Amjed Syed
- Status: Active

Location
- Location: 56 Boustead Avenue, Toronto, Ontario; M6R 1Y9
- Country: Canada
- Coordinates: 43°39′12″N 79°27′16″W

Architecture
- Type: Presbyterian church
- Funded by: King Faisal of Saudi Arabia (1969)
- Established: 1961 (as a congregation)
- Completed: 1930 (as a church); 1969 (as a mosque)

Website
- isnacanada.com/locations/jami-mosque-toronto

The Jami Mosque (Arabic: مسجد جامع) is a mosque, located just east of High Park in Toronto, Ontario, Canada. It is the oldest Canadian Islamic centre in the city.

Built in 1930 as a Presbyterian church, the building was purchased in 1969 by Toronto's Muslim community, and converted into the city's first Islamic worship centre.

== History ==
Jami's congregation was founded in 1961 and first met in a leather shop near Dundas West and Keele. The structure that now houses the mosque was originally built in 1930 by John Francis Brown & Son as the High Park Presbyterian Church. In 1969, the Muslim Society of Toronto secured funds from King Faisal of Saudi Arabia to secure purchase the church building as a home for the pre-existing congregation and as Toronto's first permanent mosque.

While Jami originally held a large number of Tablighi Jamaat followers, the numbers declined after a large influx of Gujarati Muslims immigration led to the leasing of a hall in eastern Toronto; and the eventual 1981 purchase of a building converted to Madina Mosque, which became the spiritual hub of Tablighi Jamaat. Jami then drifted towards finding leadership in the Muslim Students Association.

== Controversies ==
B'nai Brith raised concerns in 2004 when Ibrahim Hussein Malabari, variously described at the time as either the current or former imam at Jami, invited Abdul-Rahman Al-Sudais to an Islamic Society of North America conference. Al-Soudais had previously described Jews as "the scum of the human race, the rats of the world, the killers of prophets and the grandsons of monkeys and pigs" sparking condemnation from the Jewish group.

In 2017, Jami was found to be raising money that was indirectly being used to fund the Jamaat-E-Islami and its armed wing Hizbul Mujahideen, on Canada's list of banned organizations. As a result, ISNA Islamic Services of Canada, the group organizing the drive was ordered to pay a CA$500,000 fine.

== Notable congregants ==
- Ahmed Khadr, married in the mosque
- Ahmad Kutty, an Islamic scholar, former imam at Jami
- Mohammad Zeki Mahjoub, arrested on a security certificate for his alleged membership in the Vanguards of Conquest
- Mohammed Abdullah Warsame, convicted in the United States for providing material support for terrorism

== See also ==
- Islam in Canada
- List of mosques in Canada
- ISNA Canada
