= Norman Takeuchi =

Japanese-Canadian artist

Norman Kiyomitsu Takeuchi OC
- Born: 15 December 1937 (age 88); Vancouver, British Columbia, Canada
- Known for: graphic designer, painter
- Style: abstraction
- Awards: Officer of the Order of Canada (2023)

Norman Takeuchi (born on 15 December 1937 in Vancouver, British Columbia) is a Japanese Canadian painter and graphic designer known for his abstract works that explore themes of identity duality between his Japanese origins and his Canadian experience.

== Biography ==
Born into a Japanese family settled on the West Coast of Canada since the early 20th century, Norman Takeuchi grows up in a context shaped by the exceptional policies imposed on Japanese Canadian communities during the Second World War. Beginning in 1942, approximately 22,000 people are interned or displaced within British Columbia, subjected to the confiscation of their property and the administrative dismantling of their communities, a reality that the Takeuchi family itself faced and that left a lasting mark on the artist's childhood.

After the end of the war, his parents resettle in Vancouver, where Takeuchi begins his artistic training at the Vancouver School of Art, an institution that later becomes Emily Carr University of Art and Design. He studies under influential artists of the Canadian modernist scene and receives his diploma in the early 1960s. With the support of a Canada Council for the Arts scholarship, he continues his studies in London, an experience that broadens his exposure to international currents in abstraction and graphic design.

Upon returning to Canada, he settles in Ottawa in 1963, where he develops a career as a graphic designer for federal institutions and contributes to the visual design of major international events, including Expo 67 in Montreal and Expo 70 in Osaka, two projects that allow him to integrate Canadian professional design networks. In 1996, he ends his work as a graphic designer to devote himself entirely to painting. In 2023, he is appointed a Member of the Order of Canada for his contribution to the visual arts and for his role in preserving and transmitting the history of Canadians of Japanese origin.

== Works and style ==
The work of Norman Takeuchi explores the tension between belonging and otherness. His painting combines elements of Western abstraction with motifs drawn from the Japanese visual tradition, such as asymmetrical compositions, flat planes of color inspired by ukiyo-e prints, and kimono textile patterns. His works draw on his personal experience and the collective history of the Japanese Canadian diaspora, particularly memories related to internment. He often expresses the complexity of his identity in interviews in which he speaks of his ambivalence about being a Canadian of Japanese origin.

Among his most significant series is A Measured Act (2012), composed of five paper kimonos adorned with photographic transfers and acrylic paint. This series pays tribute to the families displaced from the Canadian West Coast and questions the notion of resilience in the face of dispossession. In Interior Revisited (2012 to 2017), Takeuchi juxtaposes faces from internment archives with Japanese decorative motifs, creating a pictorial space in which memory overlays tradition. His renewed interest in Japanese visual heritage emerges after discovering the kimonos of artist Itchiku Kubota during an exhibition presented in Ottawa in the 1990s.

His style, initially abstract and influenced by Canadian lyrical expressionism, evolves into a form of narrative abstraction in which symbol, archive, and memory interact with a contemporary visual language.

== Exhibitions and recognition ==
Norman Takeuchi exhibits in numerous Canadian galleries, including the Ottawa Art Gallery, the Canadian War Museum, and the Japanese Canadian Cultural Centre in Toronto. In 2023, the Ottawa Art Gallery devotes a retrospective to him titled Shapes in Between: Norman Takeuchi a Retrospective, covering more than sixty years of artistic production. His works are held in several public collections, including those of the Canadian War Museum, the National Gallery of Canada, the Canada Council Art Bank, the Carleton University Art Gallery, and the Royal Ontario Museum.
