= Baitul Hamd =

Baitul Hamd (English: “A Praiseworthy Place”) may refer to:

- Baitul Hamd (Bradford), England
- Baitul Hamd (Mississauga), Toronto, Canada

== See also ==
- Hamd
