= List of mosques in Canada =

Notable mosques and islamic places of worship

This is an alphabetical listing of notable mosques in Canada (Arabic: Masjid, French: Mosquée), including Islamic places of worship that do not qualify as traditional mosques.

== List of mosques ==
=== Alberta ===
Name	Image	Location	Year	Group	Notes
Akram Jomaa Islamic Centre		Calgary	1992	S	
Al-Rashid Mosque		Edmonton	1938	S	First purpose-built mosque in Canada
Al Kareem Mosque		Lac La Biche	1958	S	The second oldest mosques in Canada. Established by the Lebanese Muslim community.
Calgary Islamic Centre		Calgary	1975	S	Calgary's first purpose-built mosque
Muslim Community of Edmonton Mosque		Edmonton	1984	ND	Evolved from the Muslim Students' Association of the University of Alberta as the Al Rashid Mosque was quite far.
Baitun Nur Mosque		Calgary	2008	A	Largest mosque in Canada.
Baitul Hadi Mosque		Edmonton		A	Serves local chapter of Ahmadiyya Muslim in Edmonton.
Edson Mosque		Edson			Subject to an arson attack in June 2018.

=== British Columbia ===
Name	Image	Location	Year	Group	Notes
Bait-ur-Rahmaan Mosque		Vancouver	2005	A	Serves Vancouver Ahmadiyya Muslim Local Chapters Masjid: Baitu Dua.
Ismaili Centre		Vancouver	1985	SH	
Masjid Omar Al-Farouq		Vancouver	2012	S	
Prince George Islamic Centre		Prince George	2006		First purpose built mosque in northern British Columbia.
Richmond Jamia Masjid		Richmond	1983		First purpose built mosque in British Columbia.

=== Manitoba ===
Name	Image	Location	Year	Group	Notes
Winnipeg Central Mosque		Winnipeg	2004	A	

=== New Brunswick ===
Name	Image	Location	Year	Group	Notes
Moncton Muslim Association Mosque		Moncton	2007		First mosque and Islamic community centre in New Brunswick.

=== Newfoundland and Labrador ===
Name	Image	Location	Year	Group	Notes
Masjid-an-Noor		St. John's	1990	S	The first mosque in Newfoundland
Masjid Suleman Dawood		St. John's	2025		Located on the site of a former Roman Catholic church
Sabeel Corner Brook Mosque		Corner Brook	2025		The Corner Brook Masjid is the only one serving Muslims across Western Newfoundland.

=== Northwest Territories ===
Name	Image	Location	Year	Group	Notes
Midnight Sun Mosque		Inuvik	2010	S	Northernmost mosque in the Americas.

=== Nova Scotia ===
Name	Image	Location	Year	Group	Notes
Ummah Masjid and Community Centre		Halifax	2011		Completed in May 2013, the mosque first opened at partial capacity on 1 August 2011.

=== Nunavut ===
Name	Image	Location	Year	Group	Notes
Masjid Iqaluit		Iqaluit	2016		First mosque in Nunavut

=== Ontario ===
Name	Image	Location	Year	Group	Notes
South Nepean Muslim Community		Barrhaven			
Hadeeqa-e-Ahmad		Bradford		A	Ahmadiyya Muslim Centre consists of a large detached house on 250 acres (100 ha) of land which was bought by the community to serve as a Jalsa facility and a Moosian Graveyard. The land is used to grow corn and carrots. An orchard of 900 trees grows apples, pears and cherries.
Brampton Mosque		Brampton	2005	A	Foundation stone laid in 2005. When completed, it will have a larger interior than that of Bait-ul Islam Mosque in Maple.
Baitul Kareem Mosque		Cambridge	2006	A	local mosque for the Ahmadi Muslim Community's local chapter; It was bought as a church and converted to a mosque.
Baitul Mahdi Mosque		Durham Oshawa	2005-2006	A	A converted Mosque from a Dutch style castle was brought by a member of the Jamaat in 2005 and later donated to the Ahmadiyya Muslim Community to serve as Mosque and centre for the local chapters of Oshawa and Durham. The property includes a 25-acre plot and has also regularly used by the Jamaat for regional sports events. The opening of the Masjid Al Mahdi took place in July 2006 during the visit of Khalifatul Masih the fifth to Canada.
Jannatul Ferdous Mosque		Etobicoke	2016	S	Daily prayers, educational & community initiatives. Developed & funded by Etobicoke Community Development Centre
Bosnian Islamic Centre of Hamilton		Hamilton	2001	S	Mosque established by Muslims of Bosniak origin in the greater Hamilton area and Niagara Region of Ontario.
Malton Mosque		Malton, Mississauga		S	Located close by to Toronto Pearson International Airport, at the corner of Airport Rd. and Derry Rd.
Baitul Islam Mosque		Maple, GTA	1992	A	Adjacent to the Peace Village the largest mosque in Ontario acts as the National Headquarters of the Ahmadiyya Muslim Community in Canada;
Al Rahman Islamic Center		Mississauga			The mosque gained notoriety in 2006 due to its alleged links with terrorists.
Baitul Hamd Mosque		Mississauga	1999	A	The complex has one large hall, a cafeteria, a library, several offices for local and regional chapters of the community. Previously, the building also served as Jamia Ahmadiyya Canada, which later shifted to a newly constructed building in Maple, Ontario.
Meadowvale Islamic Center		Mississauga	2025	S	
		Mississauga		S	Islamic Society of North America
Masjid Al-Farooq		Mississauga	1987	S	First mosque in the City of Mississauga
Ahmadiyya Abode of Peace		North York		A	A 14-story building run by the Ahmadiyya Muslim Community and predominantly inhabited by Ahmadi Muslims making up 98 percent of the nearly 150 families living in the building. A hall on the first floor of the building serves as the gathering centre for the local chapter.
Masjid Noor-Ul-Haram		Oakville		S	
Ahmadiyya Muslim Mosque		Ottawa		A	Established by the Ahmadiyya Muslim Association.
Ahmadiyya Muslim Mosque Kanata		Ottawa		A	Established by the Ahmadiyya Muslim Association.
Assalam Mosque		Ottawa			Assalam mosque (Ottawa Islamic Centre) in the Ottawa Business Park on St. Laurent Avenue
Bilal Mosque		Ottawa-Orléans			
Dar As-Sunnah Mosque		Ottawa	2011	S	Assunnah Muslim Association
Islam Care Centre Mosque		Ottawa	1993	S	Previously known as Islamic Information Centre or Lisgar Mosque. The only mosque in downtown Ottawa, which also serves as a community centre, a resource centre, and a family service centre.
Jami Omar		Ottawa-Carleton			
Ottawa Ismaili Mosque		Ottawa		SH	Ismaili Council for Ottawa
Ottawa Mosque		Ottawa		S	Ottawa Muslim Association
Baitul Hanif Mosque		Toronto		A	Oldest mosque of the Ahmadiyya Muslim Community in its eastern GTA and serves as the local mosque for the local chapter of Toronto East.
Bosnian Islamic Association Gazi Husrev-Beg		Toronto		S	
Islamic Foundation		Toronto	1969	S	First purpose-built mosque in Canada
Islamic Society of Niagara Peninsula (ISNP)		Niagara Falls	1970s	S	Niagara Region's first masjid offering daily salah, Jumuah, and other services.
Ismaili Centre		Toronto	2010	SH	
Jame Abu Bakr Siddique		Toronto	1970s	S	
Jami Mosque		Toronto	1969		Formerly a Presbyterian church and converted into the city's first worship centre.
Noor Cultural Centre		Toronto	2003		Likely closed in October 2021, as a result of the COVID-19 pandemic.
Salaheddin Islamic Centre		Toronto		S	
Masjid Omar Farooq (Anjuman Khadimul Muslimein)		Toronto	2005		
Toronto and Region Islamic Congregation		Toronto	1991	S	
Jaffari Community Centre		Vaughan, GTA	1987	SH	Largest mosque in North America
Masjid Vaughan		Vaughan, GTA	2018		Daily prayers, Friday Prayers, educational initiatives.
ALBER Mosque		Windsor	2006	S	Al-Bar Mosque plays an essential role in Windsor, Ontario, as a place of worship for the Sunni Muslim community.
Baitul Ehsaan Mosque		Windsor		A	A primary school building which includes a Gym, several class rooms and small school field in the back lot was bought by the Ahmadiyya Muslim Community. The Masjid serves as the local Ahmadiyya Muslim chapter.
Rose City Islamic Centre (RCIC)		Windsor	2019	S	A mosque and community centre serving the social service needs of the Muslim community in the region.
Windsor Mosque		Windsor	2024	S	A mosque and School community centre serving the social service needs of the Muslim community in the region.
Masjid At-Taqwa		Windsor	2013	S	

=== Prince Edward Island ===
Name	Image	Location	Year	Group	Notes
Masjid Dar as-Salam		Charlottetown	2012		First purpose-built mosque in Prince Edward Island. The mosque has a capacity for 500 people.

=== Quebec ===
Name	Image	Location	Year	Group	Notes
Al-Omah Al-Islamiah Mosque		Montreal			
Al Nusrat Mosque		Montreal		A	Located in the north-central part of the Island of Montreal, the current Masjid was a former Banquet Hall facility and consists of three halls and a large commercial kitchen. The building has several shops for rent by the Jamaat which are due to change when their contracts are finished.
Islamic Centre of Montreal		Montreal	2012		A former war memorial hall, completed in 1929
Islamic Centre of Quebec		Montreal	1958		Second mosque built in Canada and first in Quebec
Great Mosque of Quebec City; Grande Mosquée de Québec		Quebec City	2009 (current site)		First site completed in 1985; owned by the Islamic Cultural Centre of Quebec City, and was the site of the 2017 mosque shooting. Located at Route de l'Église and Chemin Sainte-Foy
Outaouais Islamic Centre		Gatineau			French: Centre islamique de l'Outaouais. 1,200-square-metre mosque at Lois and St. Jean Bosco Roads, Ottawa

=== Saskatchewan ===
Name	Image	Location	Year	Group	Notes
Ahmadiyya Muslim Centre		Regina	2011-2012	A	Located in the city centre, an official mosque is under construction in the city on a bought plot the contract for which was signed in July 2011
Darur Rahmat Mosque		Saskatoon		A	Serves the local chapter of Saskatoon but a much larger mosque is under construction in the southeastern suburban area on a five-acre plot that has already been brought. The foundation stone was laid early during the time of the fourth Khalifa. Construction of this mosque has been completed in January 2017. It can hold around 2000 people and it is the second biggest mosque in Canada.

=== Yukon ===
Name	Image	Location	Year	Group	Notes
Yukon Muslim Society		Whitehorse	2018		First mosque in Yukon

== Legend ==
Group / Tradition	Abbreviation
Ahmadiyya	A
Non-denominational	ND
Shia Islam	SH
Sunni Islam	S

== See also ==
- Islam in Canada
- List of mosques in Ottawa
- Lists of mosques in North America
