= Shia Islam in Canada =

The Shia Eid Prayer by Grand Ayatollah Reza Hosseini Nassab in Toronto, Ontario, Canada.

Shia Islam in Canada is a part of the global Shia. Shia Muslims have been a featuring segment of the Canadian Muslim society whose population has grown from the 1970s and onwards due to factors such as immigration and conversion.

== Community ==
The Shia Muslim jamaat (community) manifests itself in two main forms in Canada. One is through the Twelver rite and the other is through the Ismaili rite. However, due to the lack of census questions that go into specific details in Canada, it remains unknown which community is larger between the two. However, both have established community centres encompassing spiritual congregational halls and attached leisure centres. The Twelver Shia have Masjids (Mosques) and the Shia Ismailis have Jama'at Khanas in the country. The two most prominent Ismaili centre is the Ismaili Centre, Toronto (ICT) at the Charbagh Gardens and Ismaili Centre, Burnaby (ICV), while the most prominent Ithna Ashari centre is the Jaffari Community Centre (JCC) in Vaughan, Ontario.

== Population ==
The Shiite population in Canada is estimated to be approximately 300,000 people. Migration occurs from countries such as Iran, Iraq, Pakistan, Lebanon, and other countries. Most Canadian Shiites live in cities such as Toronto, Montreal, and Vancouver.

== Adherents ==
Reza Hosseini Nassab is a Canadian Grand Ayatollah of the Twelver rite. Anisa Mehdi is a film director and journalist, who although a Shia, reports on her faith from a Pan-Islamic viewpoint. Muhammad Rizvi is a Canadian Twelver scholar and orator who serves as both the Representative of Ali al-Sistani to Canada and the imam of the Jaffari Community Centre.

== Notable Canadian Shia Muslims ==
- Amir Attaran – lawyer, immunologist and law professor
- Maziar Bahari – journalist, filmmaker and human rights activist
- Farid Haerinejad – documentary maker and blogger
- Salma Lakhani – Lieutenant Governor of Alberta
- Mobina Jaffer – lawyer, British Columbia senator
- Rahim Jaffer – former Alberta Member of Parliament
- Amir Khadir – National Assembly member and former Québec Solidaire co-spokesperson
- Hassan Khosrowshahi – founder of electronics retailer Future Shop
- Rizwan Manji – television and film actor
- Anisa Mehdi – Emmy Award-winning film director and journalist
- Reza Hosseini Nassab – Grand Ayatollah
- Naheed Nenshi – non-profit sector consultant, mayor of Calgary
- Yasmin Ratansi – accountant, MP; first Muslim woman elected to the House of Commons of Canada
- Muhammad Rizvi – author, speaker, and chief imam of the Jaffari Community Centre
- Omar Sachedina – television journalist and newsreader
- Aliza Vellani – television actress (Little Mosque on the Prairie)
- Ali Velshi – television journalist now working in the US
- Alykhan Velshi – lawyer and former political advisor to Stephen Harper
- Murad Velshi – former member of the Ontario Legislative Assembly, father of Ali Velshi
- Rana Bokhari – Lawyer, Former Leader of Manitoba Liberal Party, Anti-Racism Activist.

== See also ==
- Ismaili Centre, Toronto
- Jaffari Community Centre
- Ismaili Centre, Burnaby
- Ahlul Bayt Assembly of Canada
- List of Canadian Shia Muslims
- Shia Islam in El Salvador
- Shia Islam in Botswana
