= Masjid An-Noor =

Masjid An-Noor, or variations such as Masjid-an-Noor and Masjid-e-Noor, may refer to:

In Canada

- Masjid-an-Noor, Newfoundland

In the U.S.

- Masjid An-Noor, Bridgeport, a mosque in Connecticut
- Mid-Hudson Islamic Association, Wappingers Falls, NY, also known as 'Masjid An-Noor'
