= Reza Hosseini Nassab =

Iranian grand ayatollah (born 1960)

Grand Ayatollah Sayyid Reza Hosseini Nassab

Personal life
- Born: 1960 (age 65–66) Yazd, Iran
- Website: www.hoseini.org

Religious life
- Religion: Islam
- Denomination: Twelwer Shi'a
- Jurisprudence: Ja'fari
- Creed: Usuli

Muslim leader
- Based in: Canada
- Post: Grand Ayatollah

Seyed Reza Hosseini Nassab (Persian: سيد رضا حسيني نسب) (born 1960) is an Iranian Twelver Shi'a Marja. He's currently residing in Canada. He was the President and Imam of the Islamic Centre in Hamburg, Germany, and since 2003 he has served as the President of Shia Islam Federation in Canada.

Hosseini Nassab was born in Yazd, Iran and studied at the Islamic seminary in Qom. He then went to Canada, where he founded Valie Asr Islamic Center in Toronto, and Ahlul Bayt Center in Ottawa. He chaired the Islamic Centre in Hamburg and founded the Cultural Islamic Center in Berlin. In September 2003, he resigned as head of the Islamic Center of Hamburg. He then returned to Canada to found Imam Mahdi Islamic School in Windsor, and Imam Mahdi Islamic Center in Toronto, Ontario.

== Fatwas ==
Forbiddance of forcing women to cover their hair: "It is not permissible to force women to cover their hair. It is necessary to respect the gender equality of men and women in law and rights."

On covering a Muslim woman's hair: "Covering the body of a Muslim woman is obligatory in Islamic law. However, the ruling on covering the hair of a Muslim woman based on the Quranic verses and Islamic narrations was one of the Islamic governmental rulings to differentiate the free Muslim woman from the non-free maid in a certain period of time when the system of slavery was still in place."

On the permissibility of a woman Marja': "We did not find any credible evidence about requisite of manhood for a "Marja". Therefore, if other requirements are satisfied, a woman can reach this position."

On forbidding the execution of apostates: "It is not permissible to execute an apostate at all."

On stoning: "Stoning is not mentioned in the Holy Quran and is not allowed."

On the purity of non-Muslims: "Non-Muslims, whether followers of divine religions or else, are all intrinsically clean."

== Publications ==
Hosseini Nassab has written more than 160 books and treatises about Islamic theology, Shia faith, philosophy, jurisprudence and logic. His publications include:

- The Shia Responds
- Teaching philosophy
- Religion and Politics
- Rights of Women
- The Youths
- Imam Hossein
- Social Ethics
- Formal Logic

== See also ==
- List of maraji
- List of ayatollahs
- Shia Islam in Canada
- Ismaili Centre, Toronto
- List of Canadian Shia Muslims
