= Peter Erlinder =

American lawyer

- Born: April 14, 1948; Chicago, Illinois, U.S.
- Died: December 4, 2024 (aged 76); St. Paul, Minnesota, U.S.
- Education: Bradley University; Chicago-Kent College of Law
- Occupation: Lawyer
- Known for: Rwandan genocide legal defense
- Spouse: Masako Usui

C. Peter Erlinder (April 14, 1948 – December 4, 2024) was an American lawyer, originally from Chicago, who lived in St. Paul, Minnesota. He was Lead Defense Counsel for the UN International Criminal Tribunal for Rwanda and represented several clients internationally, most notably several Rwandan opposition leaders, including Rwandan presidential candidate Victoire Ingabire.

== Biography ==
Erlinder was born in Chicago. He received his bachelor's degree from Bradley University, then spent two years at Georgetown University Law Center. He graduated from Chicago-Kent College of Law, and was a lecturer at the University of Chicago, before becoming a professor at William Mitchell College of Law. He retired in 2012 and died in St. Paul on December 4, 2024.

== Defendants ==
Erlinder specialized in high-profile crimes involving terrorism, the death penalty, civil rights, claims of government and police misconduct, and criminal defense of political activists. Some of the clients he has defended include:

- Mohammed Abdullah Warsame
- Sami al-Arian
- Victoire Ingabire

== Arrest in Rwanda ==
Erlinder was arrested on May 28, 2010, in the Rwandan capital. He defended opposition leader Victoire Ingabire against the same charge he faced, a law prohibiting "Genocide Ideology" – speech refuting that the 1994 Rwandan genocide occurred exactly as the Rwandan government claims. The Republic of Rwanda issued a statement claiming that Erlinder "continually engaged in conspiracy theories and denial surrounding the circumstances of the genocide [and] has promulgated this dangerous and distorted fiction over many years." This statement claimed that he was arrested for allegedly denying the Rwandan genocide, and accused him of links to FDLR. Police spokesman Eric Kayiranga claimed that Erlinder said that "no Tutsis were killed by Hutus." As a result of Kayiranga's claim, some media reported that Erlinder's defense of clients accused of genocide included the argument "that the Tutsis were not the primary victims but the instigators and that the massacres were actually part of a civil war."

Although "Conspiracy to commit genocide" is just one of six possible genocidal crimes enumerated in the "Convention on the Prevention and Punishment of the Crime of Genocide," the crime of genocide still requires proof of "intent to destroy, in whole or in part, a national, ethnical, racial or religious group."

Erlinder sued Kagame for ordering the Rwandan Patriotic Front (RPF) to commit war crimes, including murder, and he accused the United States of turning a blind eye to Kagame's wrongdoing. Amnesty International has confirmed that the RPF committed war crimes and crimes against humanity, but the crimes have largely escaped international notice.

The National Lawyers Guild called for his immediate release. William Mitchell College of Law stated that it stands in solidarity with Erlinder. The International Criminal Defence Attorneys Association condemned Erlinder's arrest as "an attack on the right to counsel and the independence of counsel," and demanded that he be freed. Paul Rusesabagina, the subject of the film Hotel Rwanda, argued that Erlinder was a political prisoner who should be immediately released, as President Kagame frequently silences his political opponents by charging them with the crime of genocide denial.

Despite the American State Department's call for Erlinder's release, a Rwandan judge denied Erlinder's request for bail on June 7, 2010, and Erlinder stayed imprisoned in Kigali. In the wake of Erlinder's detention, the work at the United Nations' International Criminal Tribunal for Rwanda ground to a halt. Defense attorneys refused to proceed with their casework, for fear that they too could be arrested and held by the Kagame regime. Recognizing the effect of Erlinder's arrest, the American Bar Association called on Rwanda to respect the U.N. Basic Principles on the Role of Lawyers, and to "refrain from harassment of lawyers practicing law consistent with their professional obligations." Other groups, including Advocates for Human Rights and the Society of American Law Teachers, joined in calling for Erlinder's immediate release. U.S. congressional representatives Betty McCollum and Keith Ellison introduced a resolution calling on Rwanda to immediately release Erlinder, pointing out that the U.S. gives Rwanda hundreds of millions of dollars in foreign aid every year; Senator Amy Klobuchar has also called for Erlinder's release, and has asked Rwandan authorities to grant him an expedited appeal.

Writing in the Harvard Law Record, an independent student-edited newspaper based at Harvard Law School, Patrick Karuretwa said that Rwanda was right to prosecute Erlinder, stating the country's anti-genocide denial laws helped ensure its stability and progress, and that no exemptions should be made for an individual's privileged position.

Erlinder was released on bail on June 18, 2010.

== Activities ==
- National president, National Lawyers Guild, 1993–97.
- Member, National Lawyers Guild Steering Committee.
- Member, National Lawyers Guild Foundation Board.
- Founding board member, National Coalition to Protect Political Freedom, Washington, DC.
- Member, National Conference of Bill of Rights Defense Committees Steering Committee, Washington, DC.
- Founding member, Minnesota Bill of Rights Defense Coalition.
- Member, Minnesota Alliance for Progressive Action Board.
- Defense Attorney at the UN International Criminal Tribunal for Rwanda, 2003–April 2011(Dismissed by ICTR)
