= Mohammad Rizvi =

Mohammad Rizvi may refer to:

- Mohammad Rizvi, Kent County Cricket Club cricketer.
- Muhammad Rizvi, leader of the Jaffari Community Centre
