= Ahl Al-Bayt World Assembly =

Shia international organisation

The Ahl al-Bayt World Assembly (Persian: مجمع جهانی اهل البیت) is an international non-governmental organization (INGO) in Iran. It was founded in 1990 by Supreme Leader Ali Khamenei and a group of Shiite elites under the supervision of the Islamic authority of the Shiites to identify, organize, educate and support the followers of Ahl al-Bayt. According to US based pressure group, United Against Nuclear Iran (UANI), this group is known for its propaganda and support of Islamist militant groups in the Middle East.

== Establishment and first conference ==
One of the most important objectives of the Iranian government following the Iranian Revolution was to foster unity among Muslims across the globe. In order to reach that goal, the Ahl al-Bayt World Assembly was established in 1990. Its first conference was held on 21 May 1990. More than three hundred scholars and Muslim elite, mostly Shia, attended. At the end of this conference, through a letter, the participants asked Ali Khamenei to establish the Ahl al-Bayt Assembly and he accepted. Its statute ordained Tehran as the main center of this INGO.

According to Abdul Karim Soroush, the establishment of the Assembly was a counter-offensive of traditionalist Shiite Clerics inside the powerful elite against Tehran's Ecumenical Society (Persian: مجمع تقریب مذاهب) because they suspected it was developing tendencies to encroach upon the Sunnis.

The following topics were discussed at the first conference:

- Ahl al-Bayt and their scientific and cultural heritage;
- Ahl al-Bayt's role in leading the Ummah;
- Ahl al-Bayt's role in the unity of the Ummah;
- Ahl al-Bayt's practical role in the maintenance of Islam;
- Ahl al-Bayt and services of Islamic Revolution influenced by their teachings;
- Human values and ideals of Ahl al-Bayt and the methods to implement them in social life;
- The situation of the followers of Ahl al-Bayt and ways to support them and raise their dignity.

== Fundamentals ==
=== General Assembly ===
The General Assembly has a group of Islamic scholars and religious and cultural figures of the Islamic world. According to the statute, the General Assembly is held every four years. The first was held in February 1994 and was attended by more than 330 members of this Assembly from 61 countries as well as scholars and researchers from different fields and Muslim countries.

=== Supreme Council ===
Some elite members of the General Assembly are or have previously been members of this council. According to the statute, members of this council are chosen by Vali-e-Faqih for five years. The council is responsible for the adoption of policies, programs, the budgets' assembly and supervision of the Executive Assembly.

=== General Secretary ===
The first General Secretary of this assembly was Ayatollah Mohammad-Ali Taskhiri, from 1990 until 1999. The second General Secretary was Ali Akbar Velayati, followed by Ayatollah Mohammad Mahdi Asefi. Hojjat al-Islam Mohammad Hasan Akhtari, a former Iranian ambassador to Syria, is the current General Secretary of the assembly.

=== Secretariat ===
The Secretariat is divided into the Department of Cultural Affairs, Department of International Affairs, Department of Executive Affairs, Department of Economic Affairs, Office of the Secretary-General and the Planning and Supervision Office.

== Goals ==
The following goals are declared in the statute:

- Revival and expansion of Islamic culture, protection and defence of the Quran, the tradition of Muhammad and Ahl al-Bayt;
- Defense of the rights of Muslims, especially Shiites;
- Strengthening Islamic unity in the face of the propaganda of enemies of Islam;
- Preservation of the cultural heritage and honours of the Islamic civilization;
- Development, improvement and reform of the cultural, economic, social and other aspects of followers of Ahl al-Bayt.

== Some Manifestos ==
- Condemning the assassination of a group of Hezbollah's warriors;
- Condemning the assassination of a group of Sunni Scholars of Basrah;
- Condemning the Fatwa of Abdul-Aziz ibn Abdullah Al ash-Sheikh about the destruction of churches;
- Condemning the destruction of the Muhammad's birthplace in Mecca;
- Condemning the death sentence of Shaikh Nimr;
- Condemning the arrest of Shaikh Ali Salman;
- Condemning the Shia massacre in Shikarpur.

== Media ==
The Ahl Al-Bayt World Assembly runs the multilingual AhlulBayt News Agency (ABNA) and the religious Al-Thaqalayn TV.

== Controversies ==
The Ahl Al-Bayt World Assembly has attracted several controversies. The organization is among several Iranian-backed groups accused of exporting the Islamic Revolution, and also of participating in activities waging a campaign to delegitimize Israel. It also has ties with the Islamic Revolutionary Guard Corps, as well as Islamist militant groups in the Middle East region such as Hezbollah and Hamas.

In February 2019, the Canada Revenue Agency revoked Ahlul Bayt Assembly of Canada's status after it was alleged to be “acting as a facilitator organization to support the operational goals” of ABWA.
