= Ahlul Bayt Assembly of Canada =

Federation of Shi'a Muslim organizations in Canada

Eid Worship 2006

The Ahlul Bayt Assembly of Canada is a federation of Shi'a Muslim organizations in Canada and includes 80 Shi'a Islamic centres and mosques in the country. The organization was founded in 1993 by Shia Muslim leaders in Canada. It had been registered with the Government of Canada as a charitable organization until 2019 when the Canada Revenue Agency stripped of the organization of its charitable status after it was alleged that the group was “acting as a facilitator organization to support the operational goals” of the Ahl Al-Bayt World Assembly in Iran, which has links to the Lebanese Hezbollah and its goal is “to facilitate the spread of the Iranian revolutionary ideology in Canada.”

== Programs ==
Since its inception, the Ahlul Bayt Assembly has been involved in activities such as:

- Holding Islamic Conferences
- Right Path Magazine
- Holding community wide Eidul Adha prayer
- Eidul Fitr celebration
- Publishing Islamic booklets

== See also ==
- Ismaili Centre, Toronto
- Shia Islam in Canada
- List of Canadian Shia Muslims
