= Islamic Foundation of Toronto =

Islamic organization and mosque based in Toronto, Ontario, Canada

- Formation: 1969
- Type: Islamic community centre, mosque with prayer hall and accompanying religious services, educational institution and social services facility
- Location: Toronto, Ontario, Canada
- Coordinates: 43°47′53″N 79°14′30″W
- Website: islamicfoundation.ca

Islamic Center of Toronto
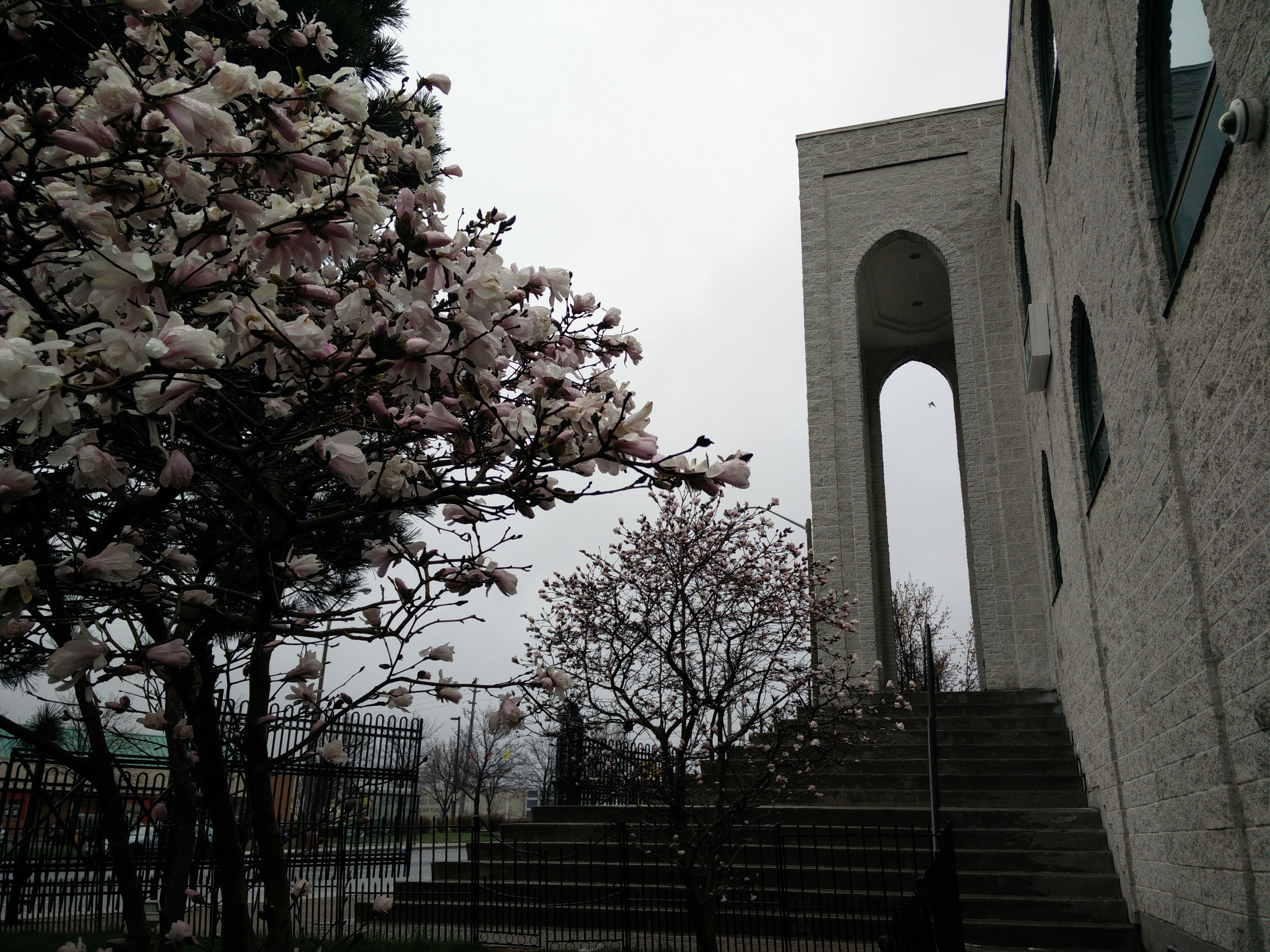
- A side view of the mosque, in 2016

- Location of the mosque in Toronto

Religion
- Affiliation: Islam
- Ecclesiastical or organisational status: Mosque
- Ownership: Islamic Foundation of Toronto
- Leadership: Imam Yusuf Badat
- Status: Active

Location
- Location: Markham Road, Scarborough, Toronto, Ontario
- Country: Canada
- Coordinates: 43°47′53″N 79°14′30″W

Architecture
- Type: Mosque architecture
- Completed: 1992
- Construction cost: CA$6 million

Specifications
- Capacity: 2,000 worshippers
- Interior area: 4,900 m^{2} (53,000 sq ft)
- Dome: One
- Minaret: One
- Minaret height: 38 m (125 ft)
- Site area: 9,300 m^{2} (2.3-acre)
- Materials: White stone; copper

The Islamic Foundation of Toronto is one of the largest and oldest Islamic community centers in Canada. It is located at the southwest corner of the intersection of Markham Road and Nugget Avenue in the former city of Scarborough. It is one of the most widely recognized Masjids in the Greater Toronto Area and has hosted many internationally renowned speakers and guests. The current imam and Director of Religious Affairs of the Masjid is Yusuf Badat.

== History ==
The Islamic Foundation of Toronto was established in 1969, when an old 280-square-metre (3,000 sq ft) building was purchased at Rhodes Avenue and converted into a mosque.

The 9,300-square-metre (2.3-acre) site, where the Islamic Foundation currently stands, was purchased in 1984. At the time, an elementary school was also conceived as an integral part of the Foundation. The majestic three-storied building in its current form, made from white stone, was completed in 1992 at a cost of approximately CA$6 million, almost all of which was raised by the local Muslim community. A 38-metre (125 ft) tall minaret captures the skyline, complemented by a copper-cladded dome, symbolizing the Muslim presence in Canada. The building is 4,900 m^{2} (53,000 sq ft) in area, with prayer halls for men and women, 12 classrooms, a cafeteria and kitchen, a gymnasium, a library, a mortuary, an elevator and over 200 parking spaces.

In August 2017, the Islamic Foundation abruptly closed the high school portion of the school, leaving over 160 students to find a new school before the school year started in September. This was devastating news for hundreds of parents and children, many of whom had contributed funds and volunteer hours for the school. As of November 2017, the elementary and middle school portions were open, although enrolment numbers had significantly decreased. Later, another Islamic school, Gibraltar Leadership Academy (GLA), rented the middle school and elementary school buildings/classrooms and restarted the high school and took control of the elementary school.

On March 16, 2020, all facilities were closed indefinitely due to the COVID-19 pandemic. The Foundation announced that "no prayers will take place until further notice," citing Ontario's Chief Medical Officer of Health's recommendation to close places of worship. Following the rollout of COVID-19 vaccines, the Foundation received a $125,000 grant from the Public Health Agency of Canada's Immunization Partnership Fund to promote vaccine uptake through influencers and community leaders.

== Activities and organization ==
The Islamic Community Centre is accessible by public transportation and is open for the five daily prayers. The Friday congregation prayer is attended by almost 2,000 worshippers. The full-time school has a qualified staff with over 300 students from Junior Kindergarten to grade eight. More than 400 students attend the evening and weekend Islamic classes.

The governing body of the Islamic Foundation is an elected Majlis consisting of seven members. To ensure accountability, there is also an elected board of trustees which holds the title to the property and advises the Majlis. The audited accounts are published yearly, and the books and meetings are open to the members, as required by the constitution of the foundation. Nonetheless, the Majlis has been known to have issues with transparency and has been accused of selfish practices, especially due to the 2017 sudden shut down of the high school.

== See also ==
- Islam in Canada
- List of mosques in Canada
