= Islamic Cultural Centre of Quebec City =

Mosque in Quebec City

Coordinates: 46.777907°N 71.305364°W

- Centre culturel Islamique de Québec

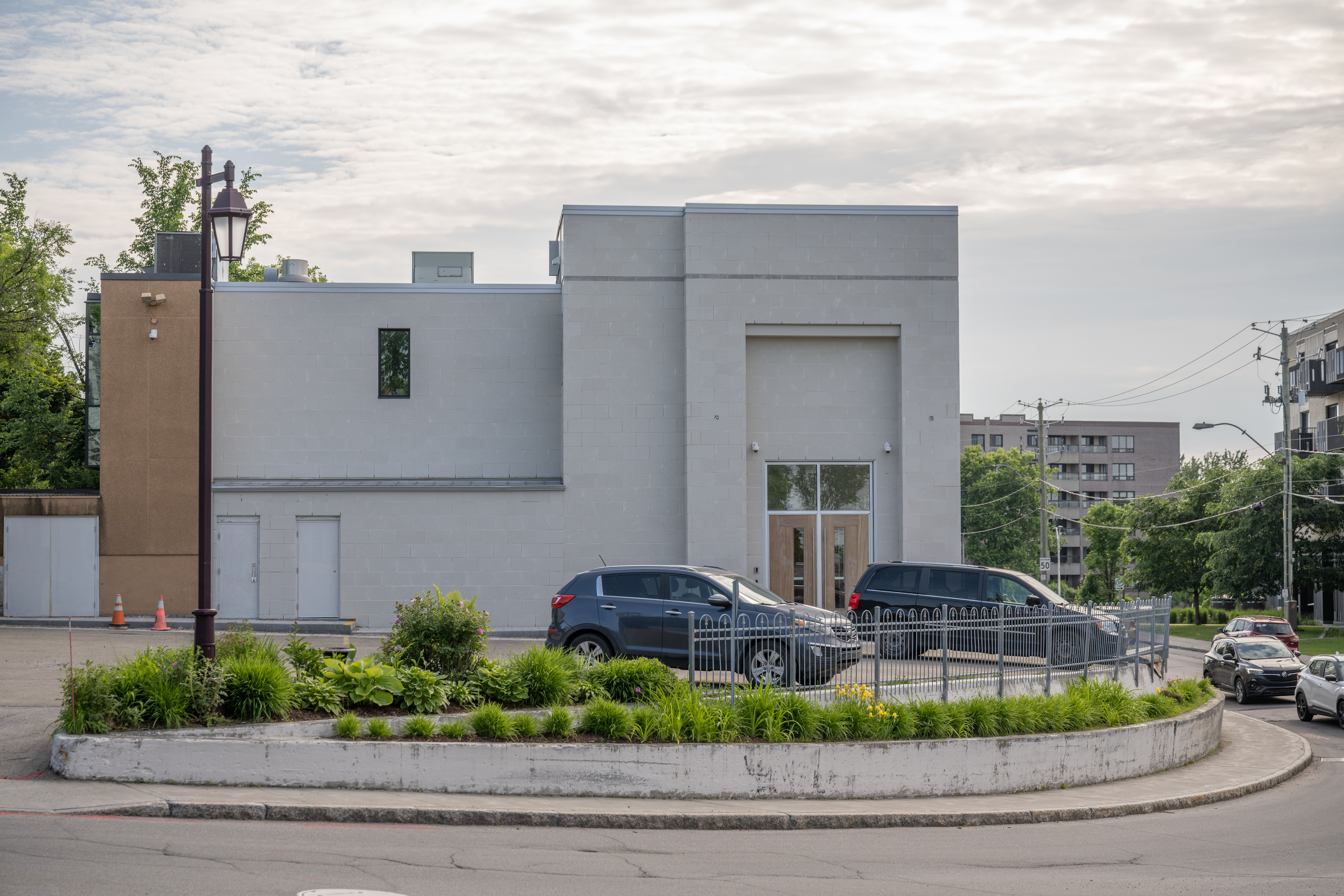
- Quebec Islamic Cultural Centre
- Named after: Quebec City
- Formation: 1985
- Founded at: Université Laval
- Purpose: Meeting the spiritual, social and economic needs of the Muslim community residing in Quebec City
- Headquarters: Great Mosque of Quebec City
- Location: Quebec City, Quebec, Canada
- Website: www.cciq.org

The Islamic Cultural Centre of Quebec City (French: Centre culturel Islamique de Québec, CCIQ; Arabic: المركز الثقافي الإسلامي بك‌بیك) is an organization dedicated to meeting the spiritual, social and economic needs of the Muslim community residing in Quebec City, Canada. Its main place of worship is the Great Mosque of Quebec City (French: La Grande Mosquée de Québec).

== History ==
The Islamic Cultural Centre of Quebec City was founded in 1985 at Université Laval. Its stated mission is "to work proactively to help the Muslim community grow and flourish spiritually, socially, and economically as well as to provide services that properly consider the specific Muslim identity of its members and promote their integration into Quebec society."

== Activities ==
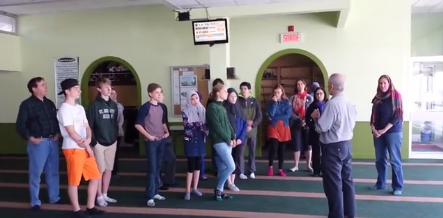
Open door visit

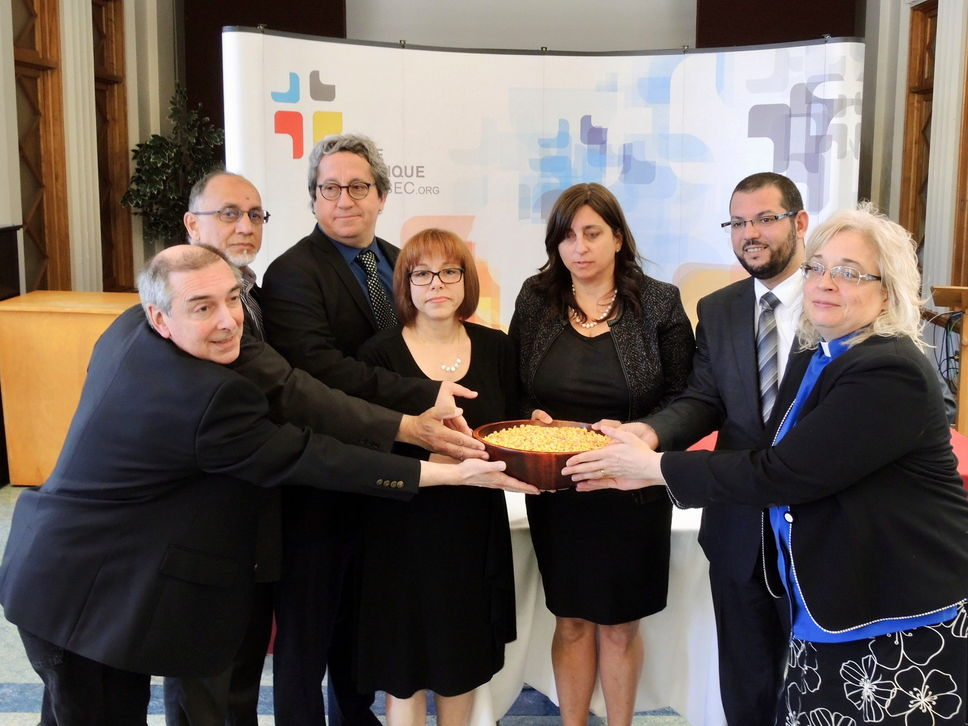
Fight the Famine

The centre offers various services and activities:

- Integration conferences.
- Quranic school and Arabic classes.
- Celebration of births and marriages.
- Funeral services

Many fundraisings and donations are organized to help anyone in need and especially the Canadian society:

- The fundraising on 12 of May 2017 to support the flood victims of Montreal.
- Yearly blood donation organized by Héma-Québec.

The centre is also actively engaged in many humanitarian causes.

Each year, the centre opens its doors to everyone, people from different cultures and religions meet and talk to better know each other and to help promote integration.

== Great Mosque of Quebec City ==
Completed in 2009, the mosque is located in the Sainte-Foy neighbourhood of Quebec City.

=== 2017 attack ===
On January 29, 2017, the mosque was the target of a terrorist attack. The perpetrator Alexandre Bissonnette opened fire on the crowd, killing six people in the mosque and injuring nineteen others. The attack was denounced by the politicians throughout Quebec and Canada and attracted a wave of sympathy all over the world.

In 2023, six years following the attack, a ceremony took place to honour of those who were lost in the shooting. This was the first time the event was held in the same room where many of the victims were killed.

== Political positions ==
The centre has regularly adopted a stand in the political debate in Quebec. Representatives testified before both the Bélanger-Campeau Commission and the Bouchard-Taylor Commission. In 2011, it also testified in a parliamentary committee in the National Assembly of Quebec against certain aspects of Bill 94 brought forward by the Charest government which governed the requirements to offer public services with uncovered faces.

In 2013, the Centre strongly denounced the draft Quebec Charter of Values introduced by the then governing Parti Québécois in 2013, under Premier Pauline Marois.

Due to some Islamophobic events, the centre increased its security, such as installing many security cameras, increasing cooperation with the local police, etc.

== See also ==
- Islam in Canada
- List of mosques in Canada
