= Masjid-an-Noor (Newfoundland) =

Mosque in St. John's, Newfoundland and Labrador, Canada

Masjid-al-Noor
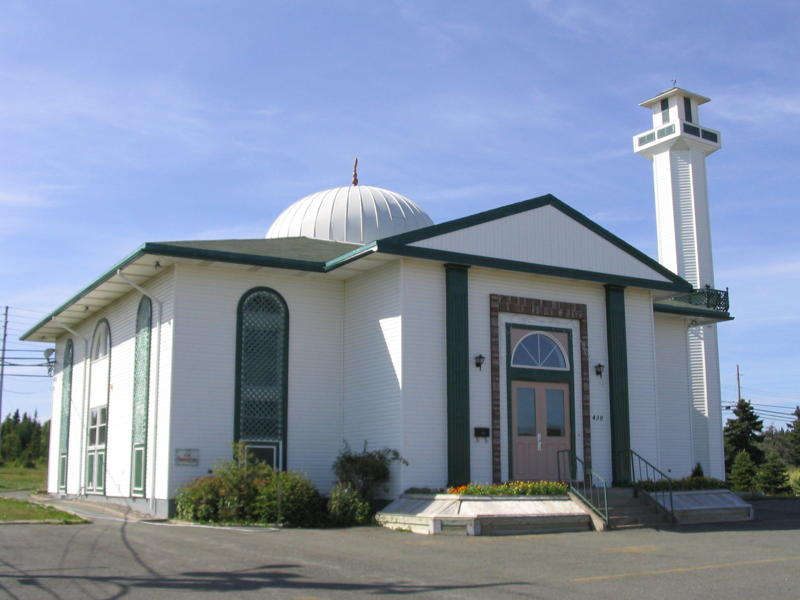
- Mosque at 430 Logy Bay Road

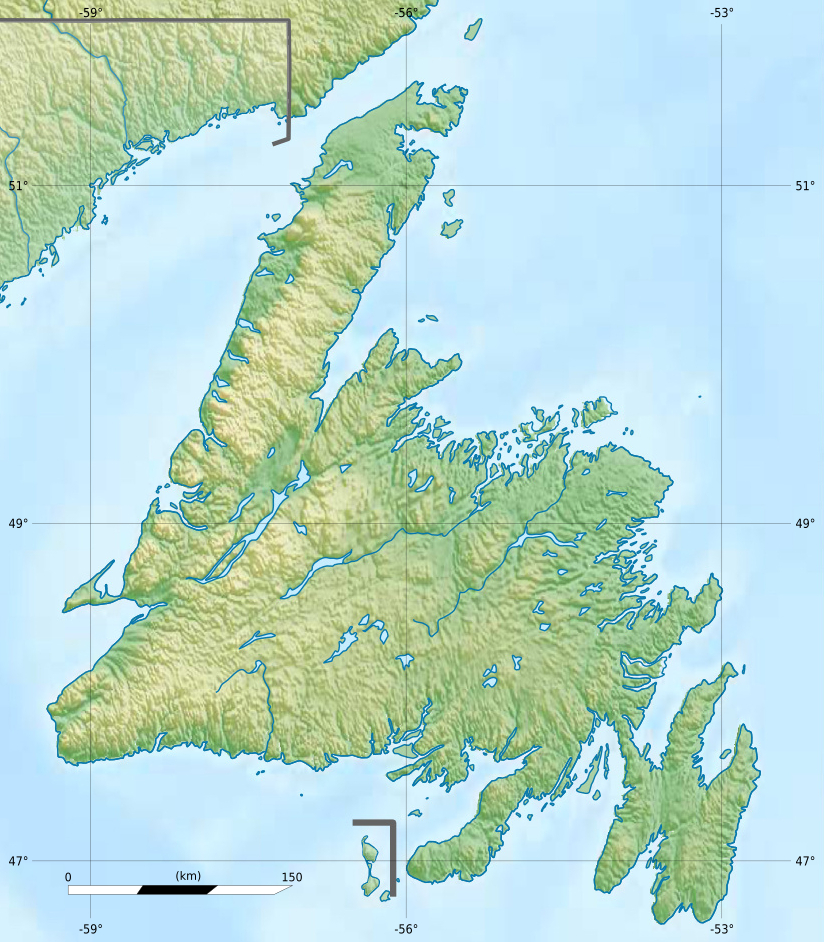
- Location within Newfoundland

Religion
- Affiliation: Sunni Islam
- Ecclesiastical or organisational status: Mosque
- Status: Active

Location
- Location: 430 Logy Bay Road, St. John's, Newfoundland and Labrador, A1A 5C6
- Country: Canada
- Coordinates: 47°36′26″N 52°41′22″W

Architecture
- Type: mosque
- Completed: 1990

Specifications
- Dome: 1
- Minaret: 1

Website
- Official site

Masjid-al-Noor is the first mosque in the province of Newfoundland and Labrador, Canada. The mosque is located in the provincial capital of St. John's. In 2025, the congregation procured a larger building at 135 Torbay Road, to be a second mosque named Masjid Suleman Dawood.

Masjid-al-Noor is located at 430 Logy Bay Road and was built in 1990 by the Muslim Association of Newfoundland and Labrador. A large proportion of the congregation are students or faculty at the Memorial University of Newfoundland.

A 2016 Master's degree thesis has studied the mosque and the role of five-times-daily prayer in the lives of Muslims who have immigrated to Newfoundland.

Having been the only mosque in the province for a long time, Masjid-an-Noor has been covered in the news for reaction to events involving Islam and mosques, such as the March 2019 shootings in Christchurch, New Zealand; in Newfoundland, Masjid-al-Noor held memorial services. An event at St. John's Farmers Market was held to express support for Newfoundland Muslims; some came to the event after hearing of it on CBC News. Messages of support were also delivered to the mosque itself. It is the most eastern mosque in Canada.

== New Mosque at Torbay Road ==
In March 2025, it was announced the congregation would add a second mosque, at the site of a former Catholic church, the Mary Queen of Peace Church, on Torbay Road. The first service at the new facility was held on March 30, 2025. The new mosque officially opened on March 30, 2025 as Eid celebrations began with 6,000 in attendance for a pair of prayer services on that date.

== See also ==
- Islam in Canada
- List of mosques in Canada
