= Shia Islam in El Salvador =

There is a small Shia community in El Salvador. The country has an Islamic Library operated by the Shia community, named Fatimah Az-Zahra. The library published the first Islamic magazine in Central America: Revista Biblioteca Islámica. Additionally, they are credited with providing the first and only Islamic library dedicated to spreading Islamic culture in the country.

== See also ==
- Shia Islam in Canada
