= Baitul Hamd Mosque (Mississauga) =

Mosque in Ontario, Canada

- Urdu: بیت الحمد
- Location in Ontario

Religion
- Affiliation: Ahmadiyya Islam
- Ecclesiastical or organizational status: Mosque

Location
- Location: Mississauga, Ontario
- Country: Canada
- Interactive map of Baitul Hamd Mosque
- Coordinates: 43°38′14″N 79°38′13″W

Architecture
- Type: Mosque
- Style: Modernist
- Completed: 1999

Website
- ahmadiyya.ca

The Baitul Hamd Mosque (Urdu: بیت الحمد, lit. 'House of Praise') is an Ahmadi mosque in Mississauga, Ontario, in Canada. The mosque is run by the Ahmadiyya Muslim Community Canada (AMJ).

In 1999, the AMJ purchased the building from Trinity Club House. Much of the exterior of the building remained unchanged. The interior was transformed into a place of worship. This building houses separate prayer halls differentiated by gender, a large Islamic library, a homeopathic clinic, a large cafeteria and commercial kitchen and several offices along with a full size basketball court as well as volleyball net on the exterior. This building has also served as the Jamia Ahmadiyya, or missionary training college, for North America from 2003 - 2010. Jamia Ahmadiyya has been located in Innisfil since 2011.

== See also ==
- Baitul Islam
- Islam in Canada
- List of mosques in Canada
