= Great Mosque of Quebec City =

Mosque in Quebec City, Canada

- French: Grande Mosquée de Québec
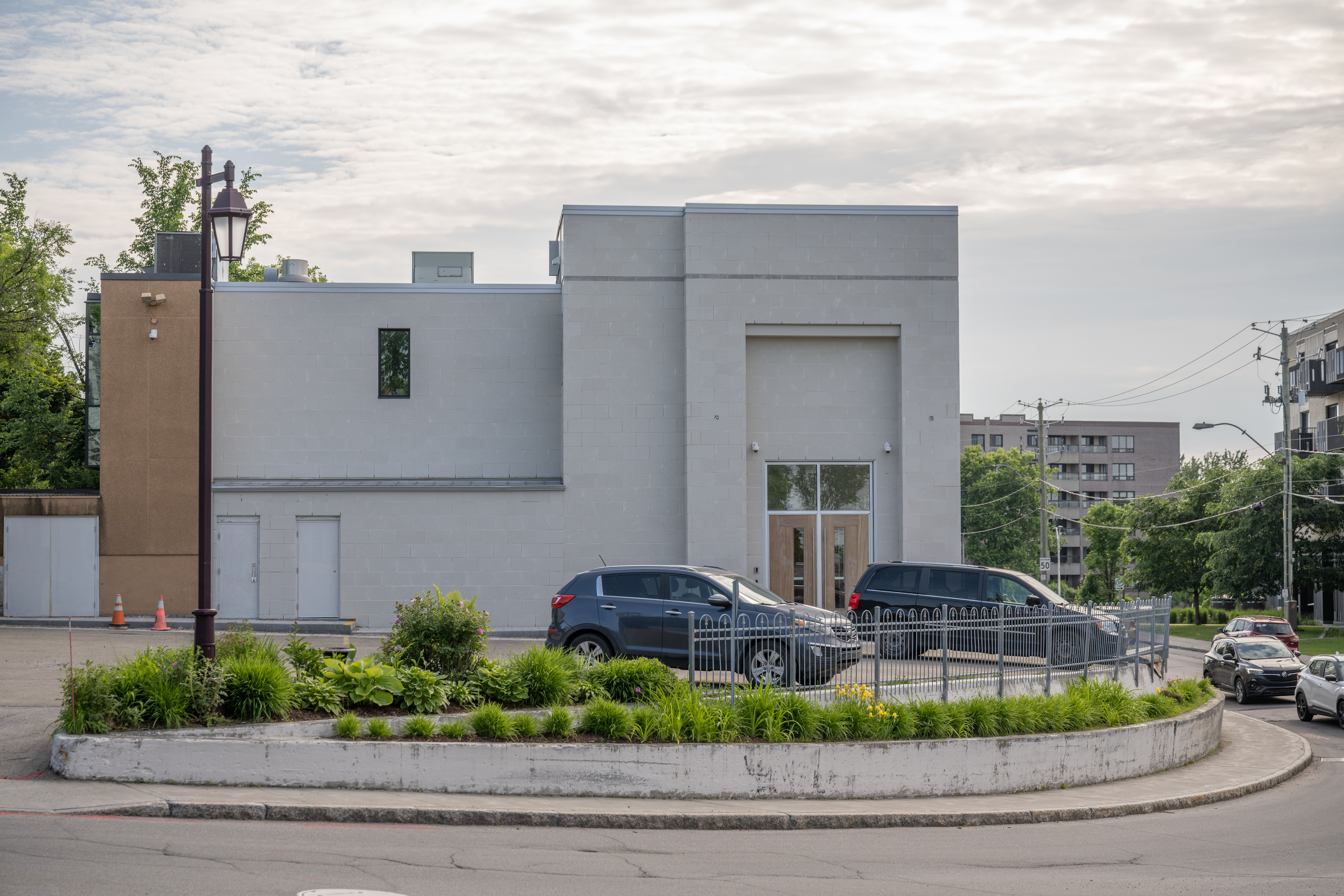
- The mosque, in 2022

- Location of the mosque in Quebec City

Religion
- Affiliation: Islam
- Ecclesiastical or organizational status: Mosque
- Ownership: Islamic Cultural Centre of Quebec City
- Status: Active

Location
- Location: 2877 Chemin Sainte-Foy, Sainte-Foy, Quebec City, Quebec
- Country: Canada
- Interactive map of Great Mosque of Quebec City
- Coordinates: 46°46′40″N 71°18′19″W

Architecture
- Completed: 2009

Specifications
- Capacity: 1,000 worshippers
- Interior area: 1,120 square metres (12,100 sq ft)

The Great Mosque of Quebec City (French: Grande Mosquée de Québec) is a mosque located in the west-end Sainte-Foy neighbourhood of Quebec City, in Quebec, Canada. The mosque is administered by the Islamic Cultural Centre of Quebec City (CCIQ).

== History ==
The Islamic Cultural Centre of Quebec City was founded in 1985 at Université Laval.

The project of building a large mosque in Sainte-Foy was launched in 2002 by the CCIQ, as a result of a lack of space at its Université Laval facility.

In 2009, the CCIQ bought the building located on the corner of Route de l'Église and Chemin Sainte-Foy for CA$1.4 million. The low rise building was variously described, prior to 2017, as looking like a building to house a hip architecture firm, with sleek lines of glass and stone, and as a medical centre. The building has an area of 1,120 square metres (12,100 sq ft) and can accommodate approximately 1,000 people.

The ruins of the former Church of St. Foye, built in 1876, are located across the road from the mosque.

== Attacks on the mosque ==
In June 2016, during Ramadan, the mosque was the target of an incident in which a pig's severed head was left outside the mosque. The incident was described as a hate crime. There had been at least seven prior incidents at the mosque. Because of the incidents, the mosque installed eight CCTV security cameras.

=== 2017 shooting ===
On the evening of January 29, 2017, a single gunman attacked the mosque. Six worshippers were killed and five others seriously injured after evening prayers when the gunman entered the prayer hall shortly before 8:00 pm and opened fire for about two minutes with a 9mm Glock pistol. Approximately 40 people were reported present at the time of the shooting.

On the anniversary of the attack, January 29, 2018, Prime Minister Justin Trudeau spoke before the House and said that the victims were "gunned down by ignorance and hatred, fuelled by Islamophobia and racism", and further stated: "These attacks sought to divide this country and its citizens, drive wedges between neighbours, and make enemies of strangers". Andrew Scheer also stated the "shooting was an act of terror", and that: "Last year's attack was a hate crime that took six innocent lives."

Additional security measures have been implemented at the mosques since the 2017 shooting, including a solid white exterior wall facing the street, electronic key cards for entry, a security desk staffed during all prayers, and two additional emergency exit doors. The mosque has also been enlarged, increasing its capacity from 700 to 1,000 worshippers.

Three black stone plinths stand outside the mosque as a memorial to the victims of the attack.

== See also ==
- Islam in Canada
- List of mosques in Canada
- Quebec City mosque shooting
