= Masjid Suleman Dawood =

Mosque in Newfoundland and Labrador, Canada

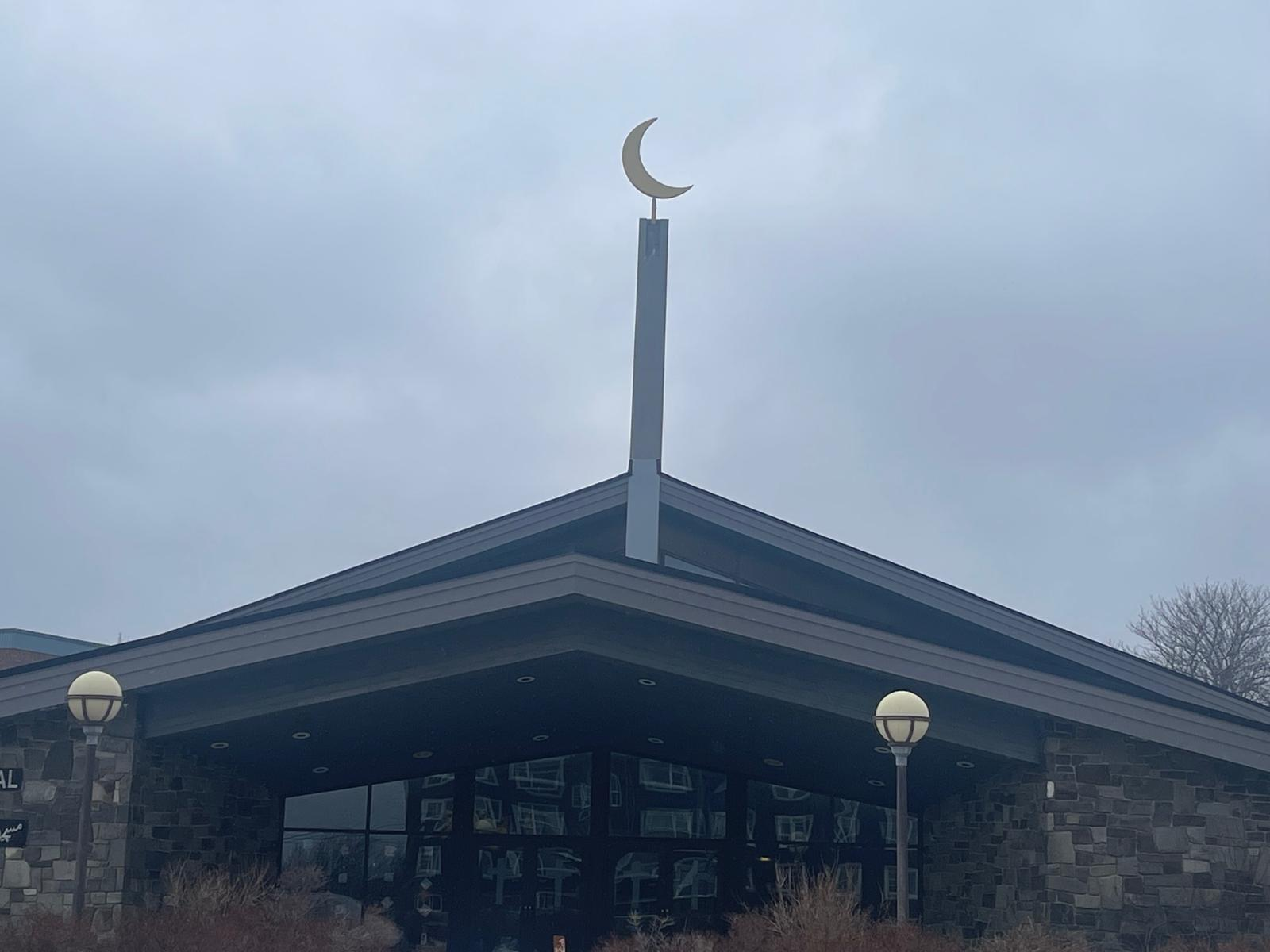
- The mosque in 2025

Religion
- Affiliation: Islam
- Ecclesiastical or organisational status: Mosque (since 2025); Church (1925–2022)
- Status: Active

Location
- Location: 135 Torbay Road, St. John's, Newfoundland and Labrador
- Country: Canada

Architecture
- Type: Church
- Completed: 2025 (as a mosque)

The Masjid Suleman Dawood is a mosque located in the provincial capital of St. John's in the province of Newfoundland and Labrador, Canada. The mosque has occupied the site of a former Roman Catholic church, Mary, Queen of Peace Church, at 135 Torbay Road, since March 2025.

== History ==
The former Catholic church parish was established in 1925. The church building was sold by the Archdiocese of St. John's in 2022; this was in order to cover costs associated with the sexual and physical abuse scandal at Mount Cashel Orphanage.

The first service at the new facility was held on March 30, 2025 as Eid-al-Fitr celebrations began with 6,000 in attendance for a pair of prayer services.

== See also ==
- Islam in Canada
- List of mosques in Canada
- Sexual abuse scandal in the Roman Catholic Archdiocese of St. John's, Newfoundland
