= Providing material support for terrorism =

Crime in the United States

In United States law, providing material support for terrorism is a crime prohibited by the USA PATRIOT Act and codified in title 18 of the United States Code. Penalties include fines and up to 15 years in prison, per section 2339A, and up to 20 years if the convict knows that the organization supported was designated as a "terrorist organization" by the US State Department, per 2339B. Moreover, the sentence can be increased to "any term of years" or life "if the death of any person results," where 'the term “person” means any individual or entity capable of holding a legal or beneficial interest in property'. The four types of support described are "training," "expert advice or assistance," "service," and "personnel."

In June 2010, the United States Supreme Court upheld the law in an as-applied challenge in the case Holder v. Humanitarian Law Project, but also left open the door for other as-applied challenges. The defendants in the case had sought to help the Kurdistan Workers' Party in Turkey and the Liberation Tigers of Tamil Eelam learn means of peacefully resolving conflicts.

== Criticism ==
The material support provisions have been criticized by rights groups as violating the First Amendment, as they criminalize activities like the distribution of literature, engaging in political advocacy, participating in peace conferences, training in human rights advocacy, and donating money and humanitarian assistance, even when the support is intended only to promote lawful and non-violent activities. The provisions are vague and wide-ranging, and impose guilt by association by punishing people not for their own acts but for the acts of those they have supported. The Secretary of State's power to designate groups as terrorist has also been criticized as being too broad, giving the Executive too much discretionary power to label groups as "terrorist" and criminalize their supporters. The American Civil Liberties Union note that: "Federal 'material support' and conspiracy statutes allow the government to secure convictions without having to show that any specific act of terrorism has taken place, or is being planned, or even that a defendant intended to further terrorism."

David D. Cole, in his book Terrorism and the Constitution, stated that:

... after lying virtually dormant for its first six years of existence, the material support law has since 9/11 become the Justice Department's most popular charge in antiterrorism cases. The allure is easy to see: convictions under the law require no proof that the defendant engaged in terrorism, aided or abetted terrorism, or conspired to commit terrorism. But what makes the law attractive to prosecutors—its sweeping ambit—is precisely what makes it so dangerous to civil liberties.

Professor Jeanne Theoharis describes the measures in equally critical terms:

Material support laws are the black box of domestic terrorism prosecutions, a shape-shifting space into which all sorts of constitutionally protected activities can be thrown and classified as suspect, if not criminal. Their vagueness is key. They criminalize guilt by association and often use political and religious beliefs to demonstrate intent and state of mind.

US Senator Patrick Leahy sent a letter to Attorney General Eric Holder and Secretary of State Hillary Clinton regarding humanitarian relief in Somalia in 2011. "I have long urged reform of our laws governing so-called material support for terrorism. The current law is so broad as to be unworkable. Aid workers trying to provide relief to starving Somalis fear they could be prosecuted if some of it were to end up in the hands of al-Shabaab, an al-Qaeda affiliate that controls parts of Somalia. And so while the situation in Somalia grows more desperate each day, with children dying needlessly, the delivery of food and medicines is hampered, first by al-Shabaab, which is denying access to broad swaths of Somali territory, and secondly, by our overly restrictive laws. The Secretary of State has the power to grant exemptions where the purpose is not to engage in terrorist activity. She should use that authority immediately to ensure aid can reach as many Somalis as possible."

== Implementation ==
The following people have been charged or convicted of providing material support for terrorism under this law.

- David Hicks, a former Guantanamo detainee who pleaded guilty in 2007 and served a sentence of less than one year in Australia, before his case was thrown out as a court found the crime is not a war crime and cannot be tried by a military court.
- Zachary Adam Chesser, who pleaded guilty to communicating death threats to South Park directors Trey Parker and Matt Stone, soliciting violent jihadists to "desensitize" law enforcement, and attempting to provide material support to a designated foreign terrorist organization. He was sentenced to 25 years in prison.
- John Walker Lindh, who was captured fighting for the Taliban during the Battle of Qala-i-Jangi, one of the first battles in the 2001 invasion of Afghanistan. He was sentenced to 20 years in federal prison on various charges.
- Lynne Stewart, a 70-year-old veteran civil rights lawyer who was sentenced to 10 years in prison for transmitting information from her imprisoned client Omar Abdel-Rahman to his accomplices.
- Salim Ahmed Hamdan, a former Guantanamo detainee who was Osama bin Laden's former driver. He was convicted in 2008 and served a sentence of less than one year in Yemen. See 8 U.S.C. § 2339B.
- Mohammed Abdullah Warsame, who attended the al Farouq training camp in 2000.
- David Headley, for his role in the 2008 Mumbai attacks.
- Tarek Mehanna, convicted of providing "material support" to al-Qaida, for translating books and videos for website At Tibyan, encouraging readers to join al-Qaida and kill American soldiers in Iraq, sentenced to 210 months.

In September 2010, the Federal Bureau of Investigation raided activists in Minneapolis and Chicago, seizing computers, cell phones and files and issuing subpoenas to some targeted individuals to appear before a federal grand jury. The FBI agents were seeking evidence of ties to foreign terrorist organizations, including the Revolutionary Armed Forces of Colombia and the Popular Front for the Liberation of Palestine. Attorneys linked the raids to the Holder v. Humanitarian Law Project decision.

in January 2016, social networking service Twitter was sued by the widow of a U.S. man killed in the Amman shooting attack, claiming that allowing ISIL to use the platform constituted material support of a terrorist organization. The lawsuit was dismissed under Section 230 of the Communications Decency Act, which dictates that the operators of an interactive computer service are not liable for content published on the service by others.

During the Syrian Civil War a naturalized U.S. citizen of Bosnian origin joined ISIL and died while fighting. In 2015, six Bosnian residents of the U.S. were charged with providing material support for terrorism. The six sent funds ranging from $150 to $1,850, and also "U.S. military uniforms, tactical clothes and gear, combat boots, military surplus supplies and other items from businesses in St. Louis" in August 2013.

== See also ==
- Unlawful Activities (Prevention) Act
- Terrorism Act 2006
