= ISNA Canada =

Islamic organization based in Canada

- Formation: 1982
- Type: Non-profit organization
- Headquarters: Mississauga, Ontario, Canada
- Region served: Ontario and Northwest Territories
- Affiliations: Islamic Society of North America
- Website: www.isnacanada.com

ISNA Canada is a non-profit Muslim religious organization in Canada. It offers a variety of programs and services to the Canadian Muslim community at large, and is associated with the Islamic Society of North America, which is based in the United States. The organization has three centres, located in Mississauga, Toronto, and Yellowknife.

== Services and programs ==
ISNA Canada states that its goal is to help Muslims put their faith into action by offering a variety of volunteer, educational and leadership opportunities. Some of these opportunities include: a monthly food bank that serves 600 families per month; programs that engage youth in community service, such as Walk the Talk; weekend Islamic and Arabic schools; Quran classes; and kids camps.

Some of the other services that ISNA Canada provides to support Muslims include marriage services, funeral services, Islamic psychotherapy and mental health counselling, halal certification, and Islamic bookstores.

=== ISNA Schools ===
The ISNA Elementary School is an Islamic elementary school in Mississauga, Ontario. It was founded in 1983, and moved to its current location in 1985; it is one of the oldest Islamic schools in the Greater Toronto Area. ISNA Elementary School offers all subjects required by the Ontario Ministry of Education: English, Math, Science, French (grades 4-8), Social Studies, Gym and Computer Studies. Additionally it also offers Arabic, Quran and Islamic Studies as part of the school's Islamic curriculum.

The school building's exterior underwent a facelift during the summer of 2005. The facelift added a cream-yellow insulation to the brick building and archways to the design, embodying Islamic architecture. ISNA Elementary School was covered by the media as part of the debate regarding faith school funding proposed by the Progressive Conservative Party of Ontario as part of their 2007 Ontario general election platform. ISNA Elementary School regularly faces other Toronto Islamic schools in a yearly basketball tournament.

ISNA also has a high school branch in Mississauga, which is called ISNA High School. The high school is housed in the Islamic Centre of Canada complex, which also houses a big mosque and the headquarters of ISNA Canada, among other amenities for Muslims such as an Islamic funeral service and an Islamic bookstore. It is one of the few Islamic high schools in the Greater Toronto Area.

=== COVID-19 pandemic ===
ISNA Canada responded to the COVID-19 pandemic by developing four distinct programs and services: the ISNA Canada Foodbank, the frontline workers' meal program, relief kits, and drive-thru Ramadan meals.

In mid-March, ISNA Canada initiated the creation of the Canadian Muslim Response Network with over 40 organization and distributed 1420 hygiene kits, 1527 food kits and 3810 fruits and vegetables to those most vulnerable during the pandemic, such as seniors, single mothers of young children, immuno-compromised individuals, and people with disabilities.

On March 21, 2020, ISNA Canada collaborated with local restaurants to provide free meals to healthcare frontline workers. The program started with restaurants in the Halton and Peel regions but eventually reached Toronto, Waterloo, and Windsor. After a month's time, the program was extended to provide meals to essential workers, including police officers, paramedics, and shelters. The program ran for two months and served over 8000 meals.

== Controversies ==
=== Mishandling of charity funds ===
An audit of ISNA Canada in 2011 found that only a quarter of the funds donated to the organisation went to help the poor; charity donations were misdirected to private businesses.

On September 21, 2013, the Canada Revenue Agency (CRA) revoked the charitable tax-exempt status of the ISNA Development Foundation, a charity that operated out of ISNA Canada's headquarters. ISNA Canada was not affected by the move.

=== Suspension for terrorism financing ===
On September 12, 2018, the CRA suspended ISNA Canada for one year and ordered the charity to pay a penalty of CA$550,000 after determining that "the society’s resources may have, directly or indirectly, been used to support the political efforts of Jamaat-e-Islami and/or its armed wing Hizbul Mujahideen." Hizbul Mujahideen, which emerged as a pro-Pakistan militant faction in the Kashmir insurgency around 1989, is designated as a terrorist organization by Canada, the United States, the European Union, and India.

The United States–based Islamic Society of North America noted association with ISNA Canada but emphasized its complete separation of governance, accounting, and auditing.

== See also ==
- Islam in Canada
- List of mosques in Canada
