= Noor Cultural Centre =

Former Islamic cultural centre in Toronto, Ontario, Canada

Coordinates: 43.72626°N 79.329°W

The front of the building in spring

The Noor Cultural Centre was an Islamic cultural centre located in the Don Mills neighbourhood in Toronto, Ontario, Canada, on the east side of the Don Valley Parkway just north of Eglinton Avenue. As of October 2021, the location was sold after 18 months of continuous lockdowns due to the pandemic, and the organization now maintains its activities virtually.

== Building ==
The building originally was the Japanese Canadian Cultural Centre and was designed and built in 1963 by Canadian architect Raymond Moriyama and Herbert(Bert) Dudley; it was his first institutional project. The location and design of the building was carefully planned to support and honour the place of Japanese-Canadians in Canada. While the building materials are quite modern, the proportions of the building, the landscaping, and details are very traditionally Japanese.

The building also has elements designed to draw parallels to the experiences of those Canadians incarcerated during World War II - the 2 story windows in the main hall have lattice reminiscent of bars, and rain water is directed off the roof using chains attached to stones on the ground. Over time the building was no longer large enough for the growing JCCC, and the estimated cost of an addition was prohibitive.

In 2001 the Lakhani family purchased the building. It was then redesigned in 2003 by Moriyama and it became the Noor Cultural Centre. In October 2021 the building was sold after protracted period of lockdown as a result of the COVID-19 pandemic.

== Activities ==
Noor Cultural Centre often conducts interfaith activities. For example, they have hosted events with Temple Emanuel - a Jewish synagogue.

They also conduct political and human rights activism such as events informing people about the Rohingya Genocide.

Other community activities include weekly Jum'ah/Friday prayers offered in congregation and Sunday school for children.

On the 4th anniversary of the Quebec Mosque Shooting, Noor Cultural Centre along with the Inspirit Foundation funded a video series called "Islamophobia is...". The series deals with the topics of hate crimes against Muslims, Gendered Islamophobia, the role of the mainstream media, and other issues related to Islamophobia in Canada.

== See also ==
- Islam in Canada
- List of mosques in Canada
