= Great War Memorial Hall =

Islamic Centre of Montreal
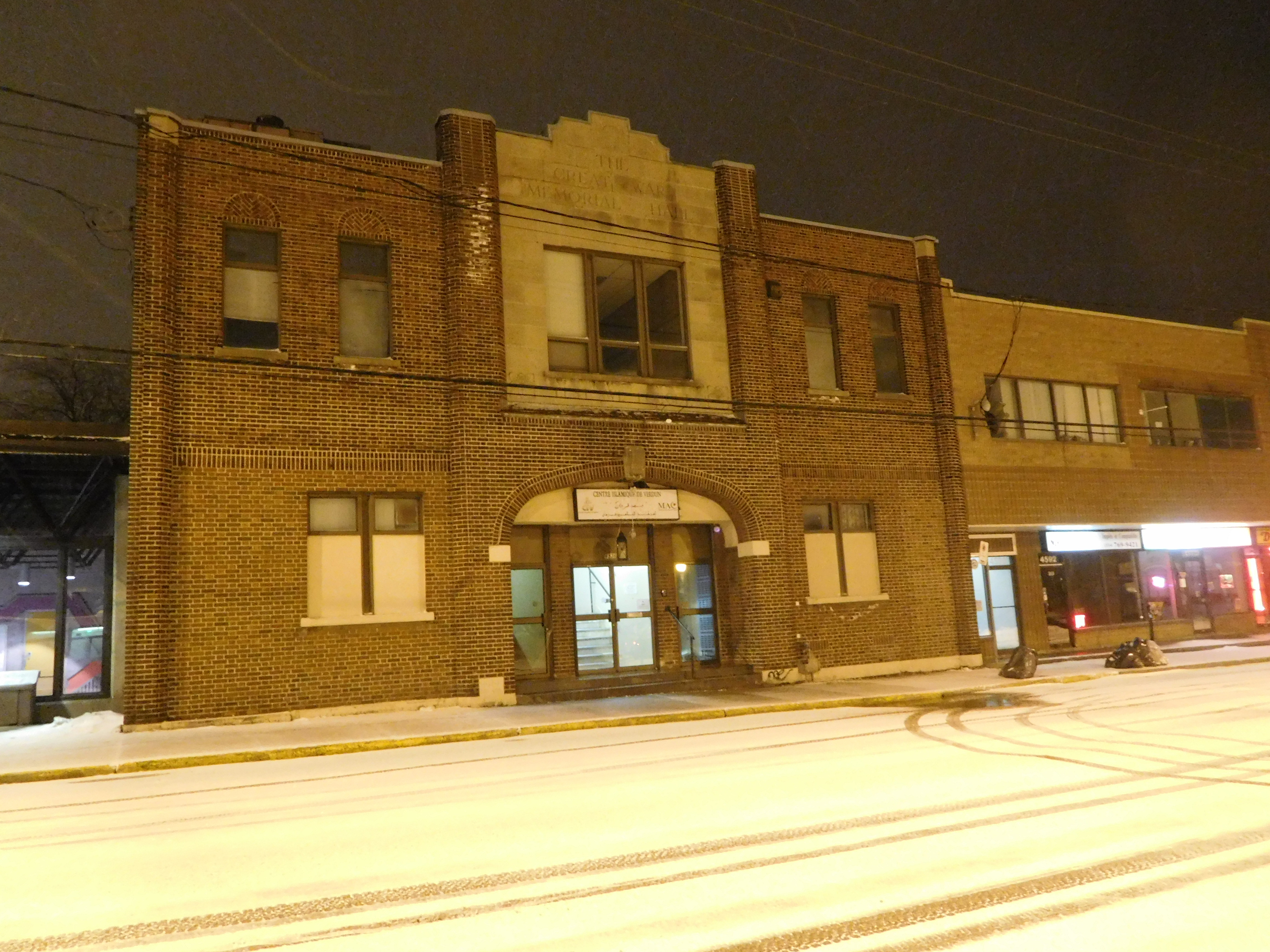
- The Islamic Centre of Montreal, c. 2017

- Location in Montreal

Religion
- Affiliation: Islam
- Ecclesiastical or organizational status: War memorial hall (1929–2012); Mosque (since 2012)
- Status: Active

Location
- Location: 4538 rue de Verdun, Verdun, Montreal, Quebec
- Country: Canada
- Interactive map of Islamic Centre of Montreal
- Coordinates: 45°27′32″N 73°34′17″W

Architecture
- Architect: Frank R. Foster
- Groundbreaking: April 20, 1929
- Completed: 1929 (as a hall)

The Great War Memorial Hall now the Islamic Centre of Montreal since 2017, is an historic building in the Verdun neighbourhood of Montreal, Quebec, Canada. It is located on rue de Verdun across from Verdun borough hall and Verdun station. From its opening in 1929 to 2012, it was owned by the Royal Canadian Legion Branch #4. The building was then sold to the Islamic Centre of Montreal, which has used the space as a mosque and community centre.

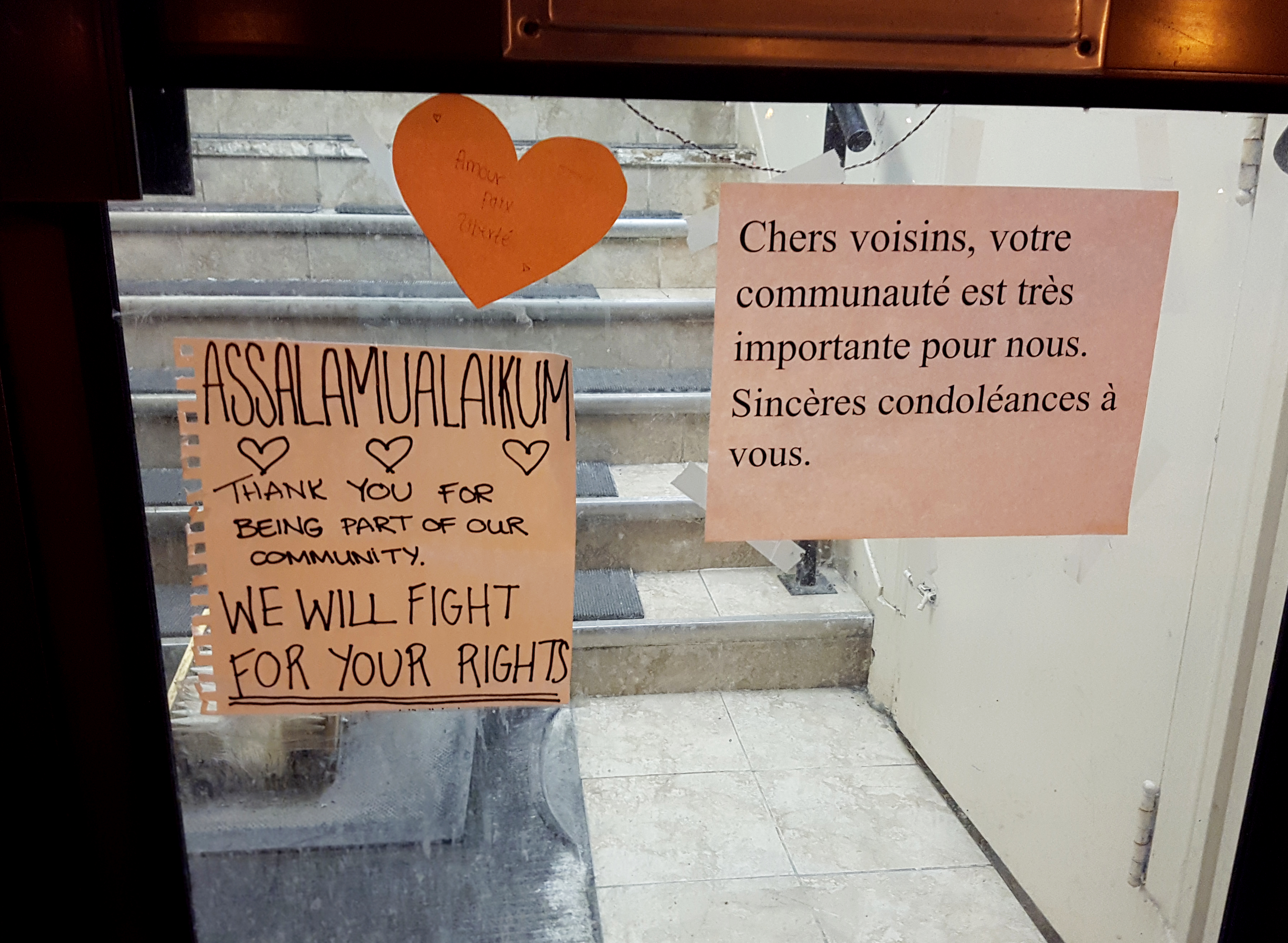
Notes left on the building following the 2017 Quebec City mosque shooting

== History ==
The hall's design and construction were overseen by Montreal architect Frank R. Foster on land supplied by Verdun mayor J.A.A Leclair. The cornerstone was laid on April 20, 1929, and it officially opened on October 6, 1929, with a ceremony including Governor-General Freeman Freeman-Thomas, 1st Marquess of Willingdon. Verdun, then an independent city, was a booming street suburb of Montreal, and approximately 20% of male residents were veterans of World War I.
