= Shikarpur bombing =

Terrorist incident in Pakistan

- Part of War in North-West Pakistan
- Location of Sindh in Pakistan
- Location: Shikarpur, Shikarpur District, Sindh, Pakistan
- Date: 30 January 2015
- Deaths: 61
- Injuries: 50

The Shikarpur bombing occurred on 30 January 2015 during the Friday prayer when Sunni militants linked to the Pakistani Taliban killed 61 people and injured 50 in a bombing at a Shiite mosque in the Shikarpur District of Pakistan's Sindh province.

Jundallah claimed responsibility for the attack.
