= Baitul Islam Mosque =

Mosque in Toronto, Ontario, Canada

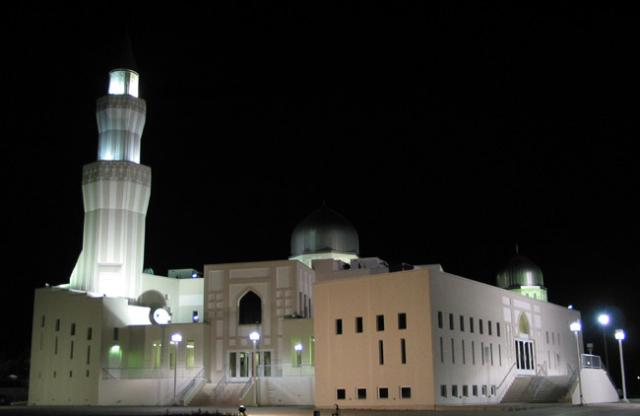

- Location in southern Ontario

Religion
- Affiliation: Ahmadiyya Islam
- Ecclesiastical or organizational status: Mosque
- Status: Active

Location
- Location: Vaughan, Greater Toronto, Ontario
- Country: Canada
- Interactive map of Baitul Islam Mosque
- Coordinates: 43°51′53.58″N 79°32′34.66″W

Architecture
- Architect: Gulzar Haider
- Type: Mosque architecture
- Completed: 1992

Specifications
- Dome: 2
- Minaret: 1

Website
- ahmadiyya.ca

The Baitul Islam Mosque (House of Islam) is an Ahmadiyya mosque in Vaughan, in the Greater Toronto area of Ontario, Canada. The mosque is run by the Ahmadiyya Muslim Community Canada. The mosque was inaugurated on October 17, 1992 in the presence of the fourth Caliph of the community and many Members of Parliament.

== Peace Village ==
Peace Village, also known as Ahmadiyya Village, is a monumental housing project of 2933 homes built on a 400,000-square-metre (100-acre) piece of land near Baitul Islam Mosque in the neighbourhood of Maple in Vaughan. Almost all streets within the neighbourhood are named after the Caliphs of the community and prominent Ahmadi scholars, along with significant members of the community. The main street is called Ahmadiyya Avenue, and the community park is named "Ahmadiyya Park". The mosque is visible from all the streets.

The village was planned by Naseer Ahmad, and construction started on April 5, 1999. In March 2009, there were plans to expand the mosque and build a high school in the surrounding empty fields.

== See also ==
- Islam in Canada
- List of mosques in Canada
