= Ismaili Centre, Toronto =

Mosque in Toronto, Ontario, Canada

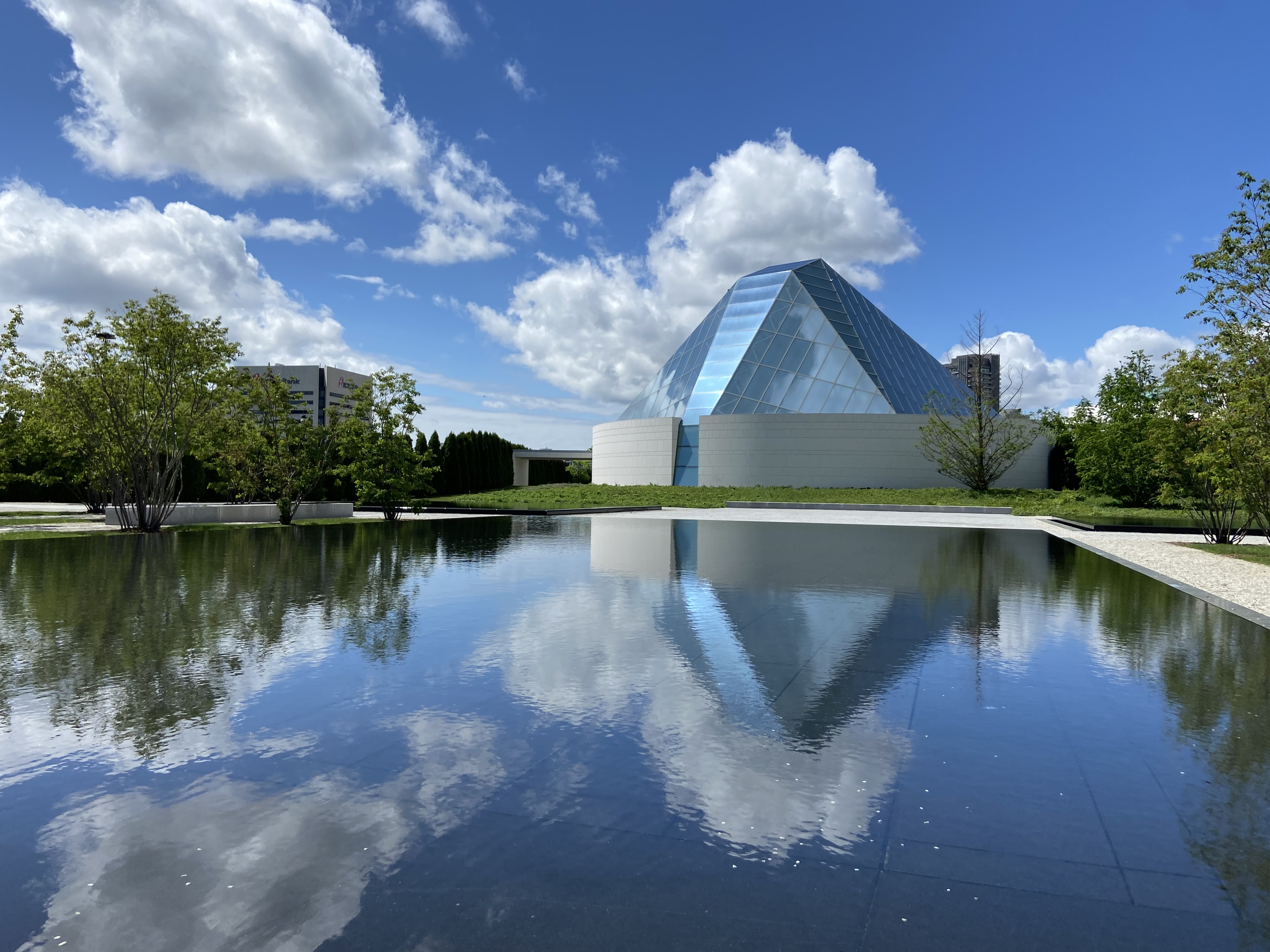
- The glass roof of the Ismaili Centre, Toronto's distinctive prayer hall.

- Location in Toronto

Religion
- Affiliation: Shia Islam
- Rite: Nizari Ismaili
- Ecclesiastical or organisational status: Jama'at Khana
- Status: Active

Location
- Location: 49 Wynford Drive, Toronto, Ontario
- Country: Canada
- Coordinates: 43°43′27″N 79°20′01″W

Architecture
- Architect: Charles Correa Associates
- Type: Jama'at Khana
- Founder: His Highness the Aga Khan
- Groundbreaking: May 28, 2010
- Completed: 2014
- Dome: One (glass)

Website
- theismaili.org/ismailicentre/toronto

The Ismaili Centre, Toronto is a Jama'at Khana (place of worship) for the Shia Ismaili Muslim community as well as a space for social, educational and cultural activities and is located in Toronto, Ontario, Canada. Completed in 2014, it is the sixth Ismaili Centre in the world. Situated in a park that it shares with the Aga Khan Museum adjacent to the Don Valley Parkway in North York, the Centre represents the permanent presence of the Ismaili Muslim community.

== Construction and development ==
This Ismaili Centre is situated along Wynford Drive in Toronto's Don Mills neighbourhood. It is visible from the adjacent Don Valley Parkway, and shares a 6.8-hectare (17-acre) site with the Aga Khan Museum. The two buildings are surrounded by a landscaped park.

In November 2002, the Aga Khan Foundation acquired the site and announced plans to demolish the Bata Shoes Head Office in order to construct it.

The Ismaili Centre had its foundation ceremony on May 28, 2010. The ceremony was performed by Canadian Prime Minister Stephen Harper and the Aga Khan, together with the foundation of the Aga Khan Museum and their shared park. Construction of the $300 million development finished in 2014, and represents a significant addition and shift in the landscape of Toronto's cultural institutions.

The building was opened by Canadian Prime Minister Stephen Harper and His Highness Prince Karim Aga Khan on September 12, 2014.

== Architecture ==
The Ismaili Centre, Toronto was designed by Indian architectural firm Charles Correa Associates in collaboration with Toronto-based Moriyama & Teshima Architects. A distinguishing feature of the building is the glass roof of the prayer hall, which recalls the corbelling in many of the traditional domes in the Muslim world. The glass dome, which represented a difficult technical challenge, is made of two layers of high-performance glass, and fritted (made porous) to deflect the heat of the sun. A clear sliver of glass facing east toward Mecca will run down the translucent roof.

=== Park ===
The Ismaili Centre is set in a landscaped park, composed of both formal and informal gardens. Designed by Lebanese landscape-architect Vladimir Djurovic, the park connects the Centre with the adjacent Aga Khan Museum. Djurovic described his vision for the park as one that "captures the essence of the Islamic garden and translates it into an expression that reflects its context and contemporary age."

Designed to suit the climate of Toronto, the gardens capture the beauty of the four seasons. The park also provides space for educational programming, outdoor gatherings, as well as offering areas for tranquility and relaxation.

== Gallery ==
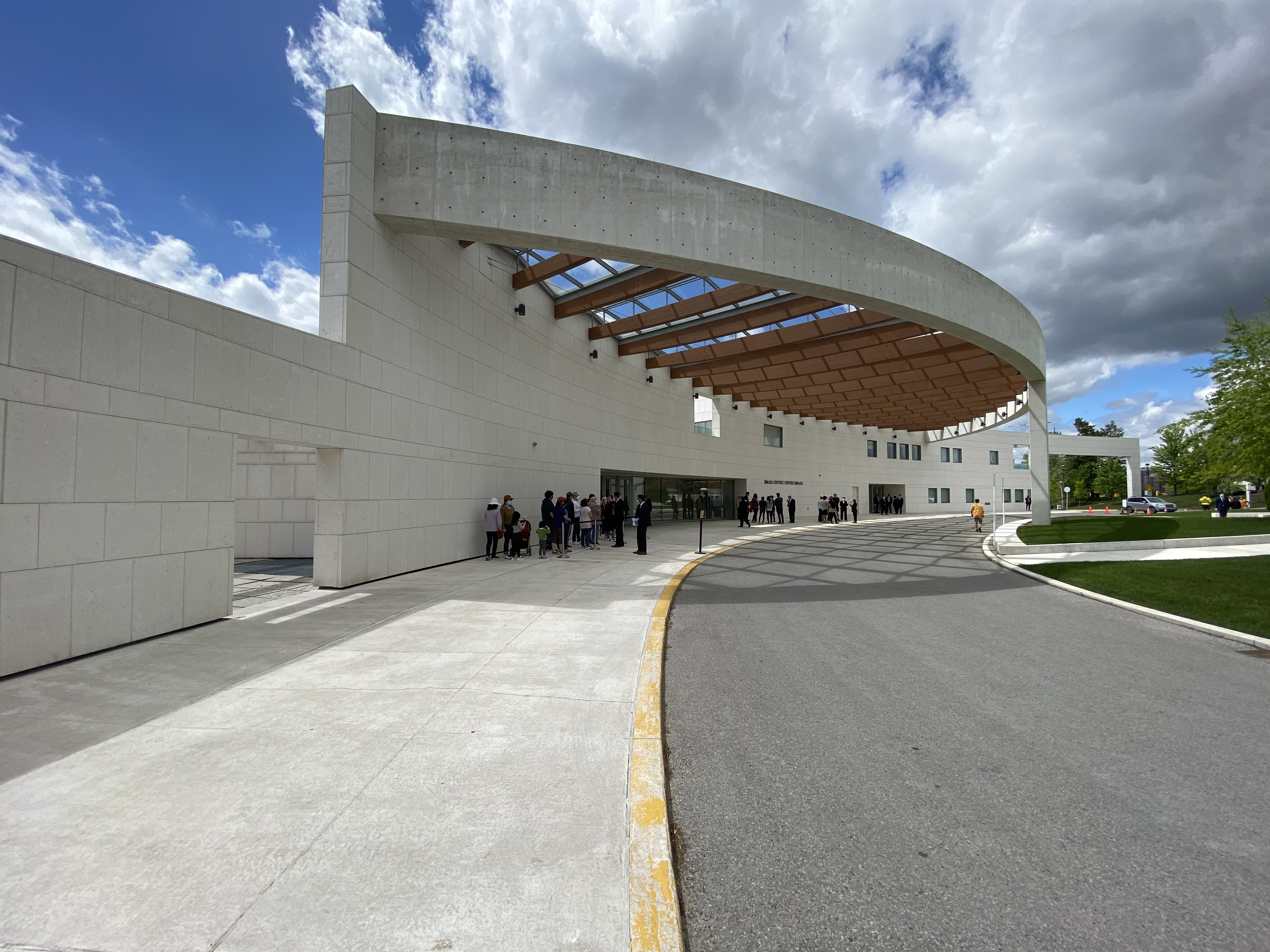
The curved main entrance

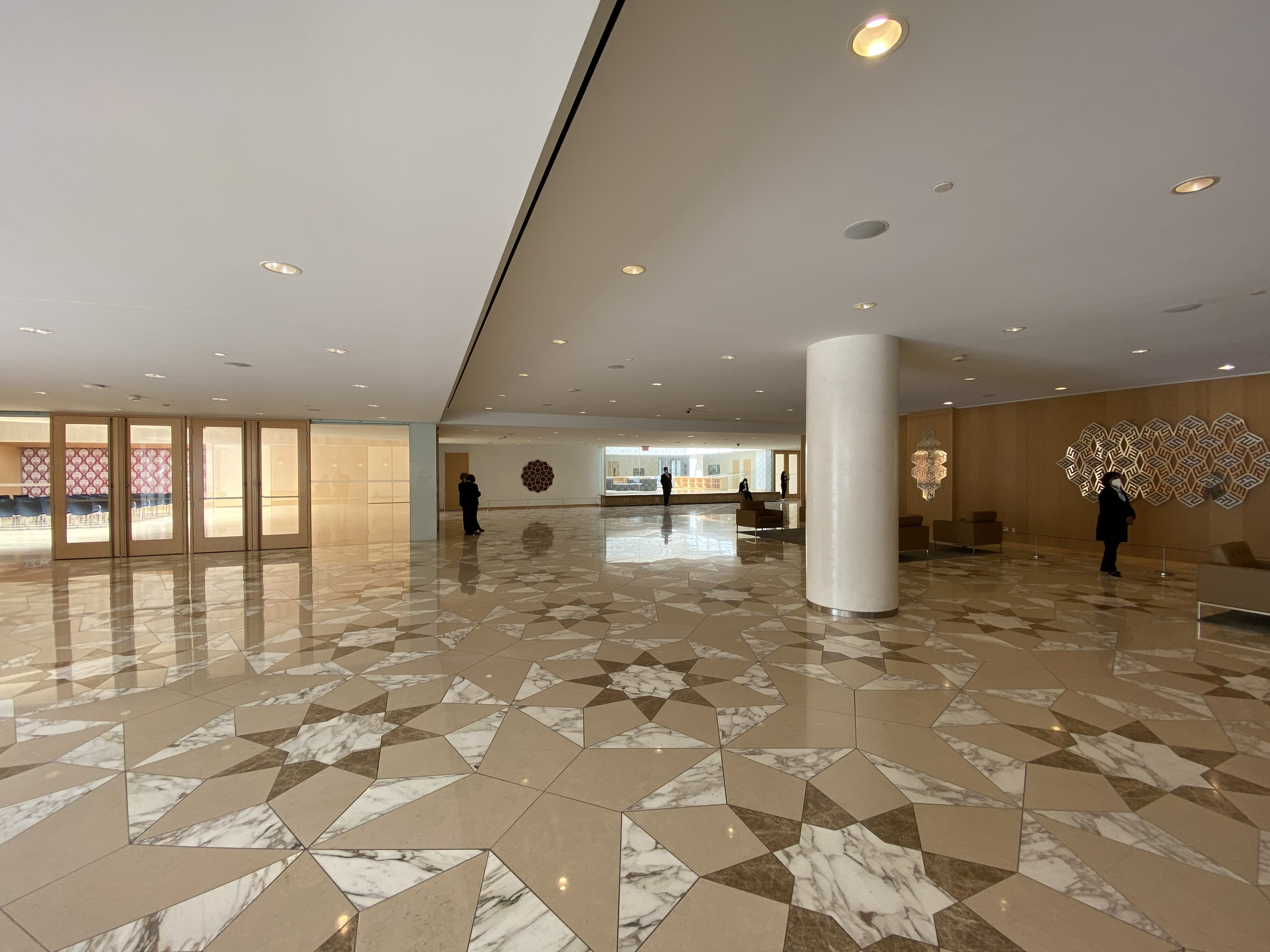
Interior

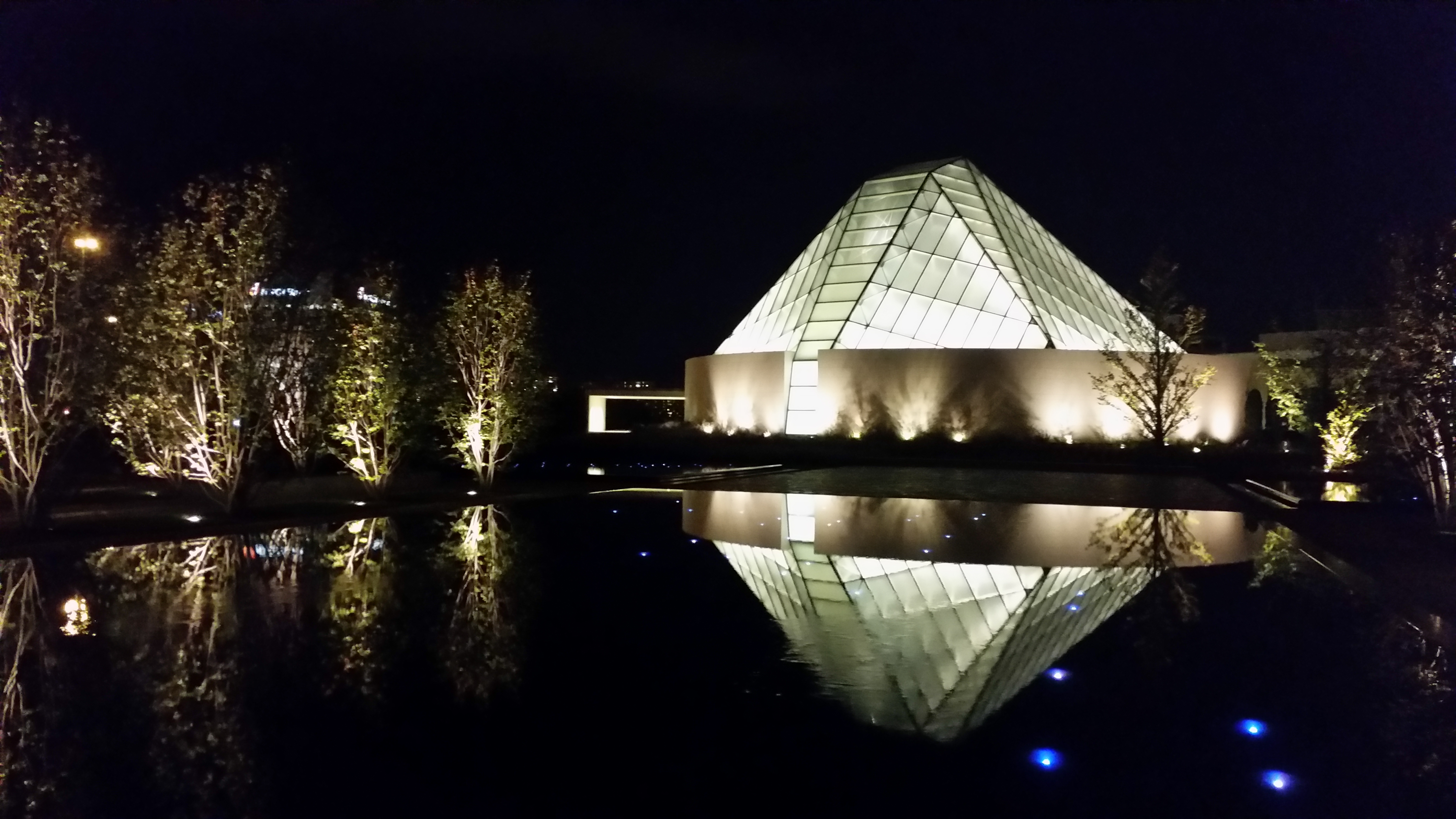
The prayer hall illuminated at night, reflected in one of the ponds of the formal garden

== See also ==
- Islam in Canada
- List of mosques in Canada
- Ahlul Bayt Assembly of Canada
- Shia Islam in Canada
