= Abstraction (art) =

Synonym for abstract art

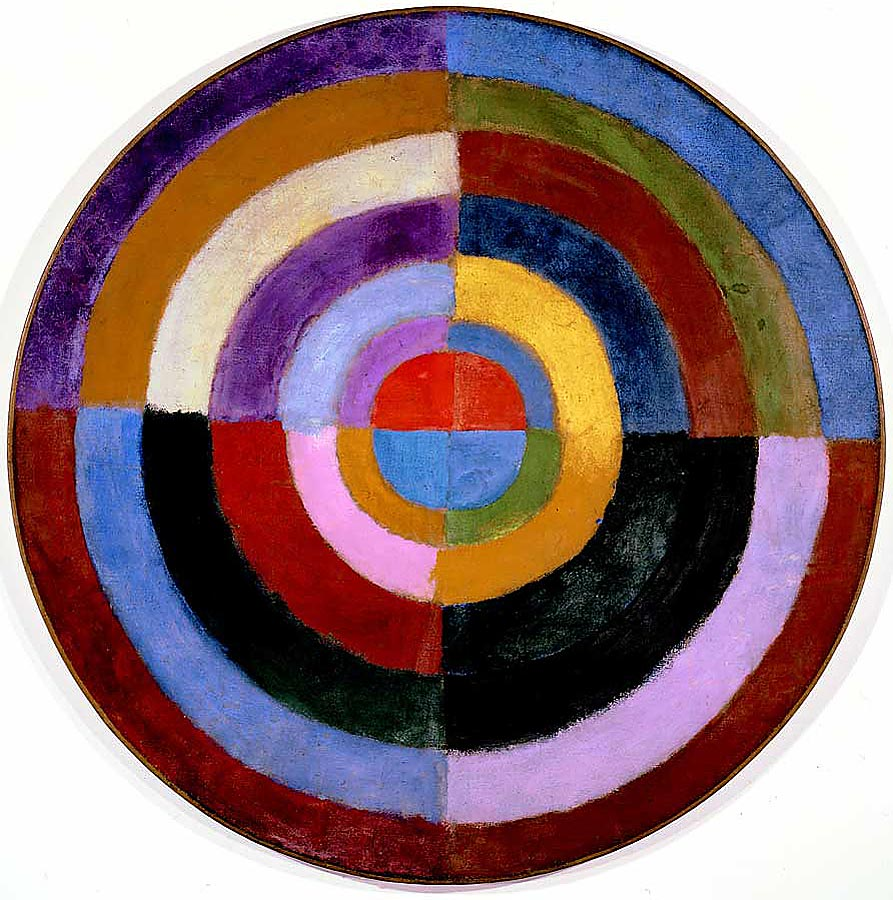
Robert Delaunay, 1912–1913, Le Premier Disque, 134 cm, 52.7 inches, Private collection. A piece of abstract art.

Typically, abstraction is used in the arts as a synonym for abstract art in general.

== In the visual arts ==
Strictly speaking, it refers to art unconcerned with the literal depiction of things from the visible world—it can, however, refer to an object or image which has been distilled from the real world, or indeed, another work of art. Artwork that reshapes the natural world for expressive purposes is called abstract; that which derives from, but does not imitate a recognizable subject is called nonobjective abstraction. In the 20th century the trend toward abstraction coincided with advances in science, technology, and changes in urban life, eventually reflecting an interest in psychoanalytic theory. Later still, abstraction was manifest in more purely formal terms, such as color, freedom from objective context, and a reduction of form to basic geometric designs and shapes.

== In music ==
In music, the term abstraction can be used to describe improvisatory approaches to interpretation, and may sometimes indicate abandonment of tonality. Atonal music has no key signature, and is characterized by the exploration of internal numeric relationships.

== See also ==
- Abstraction – Process of generalization
