= Mohammed Warsame =

Man convicted in 2009 of support for Al-Qaida

Mohamed Abdullah Warsame
- Born: August 12, 1973 (age 53); Mogadishu, Somalia
- Arrested: December 6, 2003; Minneapolis; US security officials (FBI)
- Citizenship: Canadian
- Charge: Material support for terrorism
- Penalty: 7 years
- Status: First 7 weeks held as a material witness
- Spouse: Fartun Farrah

Mohamed Abdullah Warsame (born August 12, 1973) is a Canadian citizen who was arrested in 2003 by the Federal Bureau of Investigation (FBI) in Minneapolis. He was accused of attending an Afghan training camp and fighting alongside Taliban forces in the country, and was charged with conspiring to provide support to terrorists.

On June 4, 2025, Warsame was arrested in Montreal by the Royal Canadian Mounted Police after allegedly telling an employee of the Old Brewery Mission that he wished to carry out a large-scale attack and that he knew how to manufacture explosives.

== Life ==
Warsame emigrated to Canada from Somalia in 1989. In 1995, he married Fartun Farah, an American citizen, in an arranged marriage. While she lived in Minneapolis, Warsame continued to live and work in Toronto, travelling to the United States twice for three-month periods to stay with his wife. In 1998, the couple's daughter, Maryam, was born.

From 2000 to 2001, Warsame stated that he had been intrigued by what he described as the "utopian" society he had heard existed in Afghanistan. He travelled to the country, where he attended two Afghan training camps using the kunya Abu Maryam. He is accused of having sent US$2,000 to a militant he met at one of the camps and of teaching English in the camps and at a nearby medical clinic. He was also alleged to have fought Northern Alliance forces on two occasions to support Taliban control and to have eaten meals with Osama bin Laden.

In early 2001, Warsame asked a militant leader whether the organisation would pay to bring his wife and child from the United States. He was told that he was instead being asked to leave and that the group would pay for his April airfare back to Canada. He later stated that he "grew disillusioned" with the militants and returned home.

The following year, he moved to the United States permanently with his wife and daughter and enrolled at the Minneapolis Community and Technical College, where he also tutored computer science students.

== 2003 arrest ==
Warsame was approached by the U.S. Federal Bureau of Investigation (FBI) on December 8, 2003. He agreed to be interviewed and informed agents about his time in Afghanistan. He was arrested the following day and held in secret detention at the Hennepin County Jail for two weeks, during which he was registered under an anonymous name. No paper trail was created when public defender Dan Scott met with him.

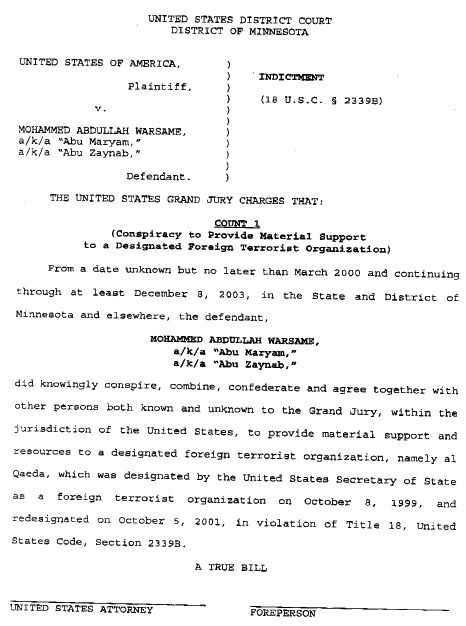
The indictment against Warsame

He was transferred to New York City and indicted on January 21, 2004. During this period, Warsame alleged that investigators attempted to persuade him to claim that Zacarias Moussaoui, whom he had once seen at a mosque, had confessed involvement in the 9/11 plot. He stated that when he refused, he was charged with supporting terrorism.

The FBI initially claimed that he had lied to investigators and charged him with providing false information. He was later described as having been fully honest from the beginning of his questioning.

According to his lawyers, the nearly six-year delay before his trial was the longest period that anyone had been held without trial in American history. On May 20, 2009, federal prosecutors announced that Warsame had pleaded guilty to one count of conspiring to support al-Qaeda, with the remaining charges dismissed.

In May 2009, Warsame entered into a plea agreement. Four of the five charges against him were dropped, and he pleaded guilty to "conspiring to provide material support and resources to Al-Qaida."

According to his lawyers, Warsame acknowledged attending a training camp in 2000, but maintained that he did not go to Afghanistan intending to engage in jihad. Instead, he believed he would find a kind of Muslim utopia. His lawyers stated that he became disillusioned and wished to return to North America but lacked the funds to do so. He attended the camp because food was provided there. They further argued that although he sent money to an individual he had met at the camp, it was not a donation; rather, he was repaying a loan that had enabled him to return to Canada.

== Namesakes ==
According to the Minneapolis Star Tribune, another Minneapolis resident named "Mohamed Warsame" — Ahmed Mohamed Warsame — experienced a delay of more than two years in his application for U.S. citizenship because he shared a name with Mohamed Warsame.

Ahmed Warsame was also born in Somalia. He emigrated to the United States at age 17 in 1995 and completed his high school education in Minneapolis, where he had lived since.

Marilu Cabrera, an immigration official, attributed the delay in processing Warsame's citizenship application to a backlog in FBI fingerprint checks. She stated that 30,000 fingerprint-check requests submitted in May 2006 were not processed until 2008.
