= Jaffari Community Centre =

Shia Islamic mosque in Ontario, Canada

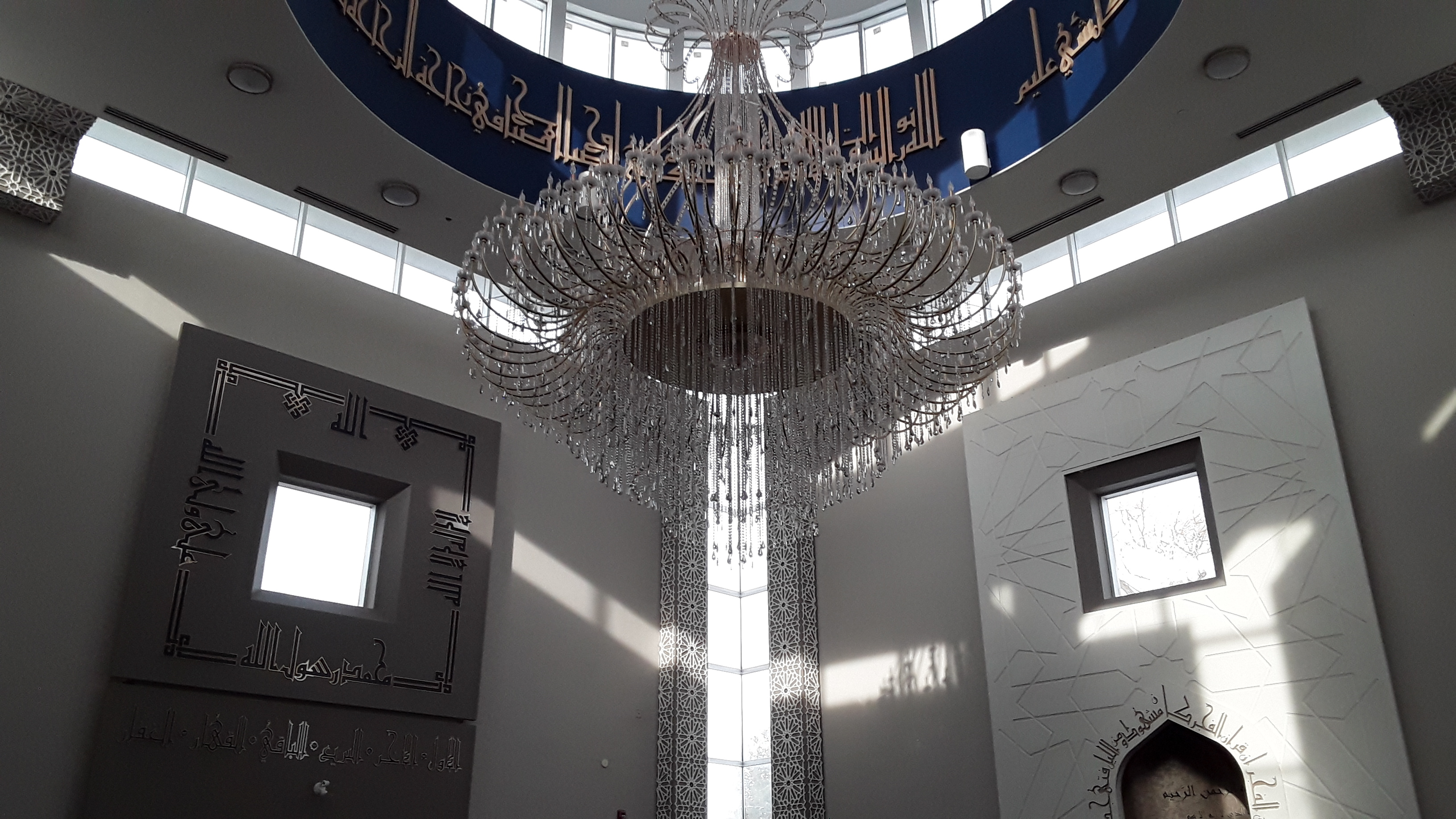
- A chandelier inside the prayer hall

- Location of in southern Ontario

Religion
- Affiliation: Shia Islam
- Ecclesiastical or organisational status: Husayniyya
- Ownership: Islamic Shia Ithna-Asheri Jamaat of Toronto
- Leadership: Sayyid Muhammad Rizvi ('Ālim)
- Status: Active

Location
- Location: 9000 Bathurst Street, Thornhill, Greater Toronto, Ontario
- Country: Canada
- Coordinates: 43°50′30″N 79°27′39″W

Specifications
- Capacity: 800 worshippers
- Dome: One
- Minaret: One

Website
- jaffari.org

The Jaffari Community Centre (JCC) is the largest Shia Islamic Centre facility in North America at 165,000 sq. ft., located in Thornhill, a suburb of the Greater Toronto Area, Ontario, Canada. In addition to the prayer hall, the centre contains a library, cafe, gym, several banquet halls, and school; it primarily serves as a mosque.

== Overview ==
The mosque is administered by the Islamic Shia Ithna-Asheri Jamaat (ISIJ) and is the main mosque and centre for ISIJ, that administers another three mosques in the greater Toronto area, located in Barrie, Brampton and Hamilton.

In 2018, the Vaughan Council approved a modified development application submitted by ISIJ for an 11-hectare (27-acre) site, called Jaffari Village, that would deliver 60 three-storey townhouses, a six-storey seniors' residence, an eight-storey residential building, a three-storey above-ground parking garage, a high school and a new park and nature trail. Prior to the Council's approval, the project faced concerted opposition from the Council residents.

== See also ==
- Islam in Canada
- List of mosques in Canada
