= Art Nouveau architecture in Russia =

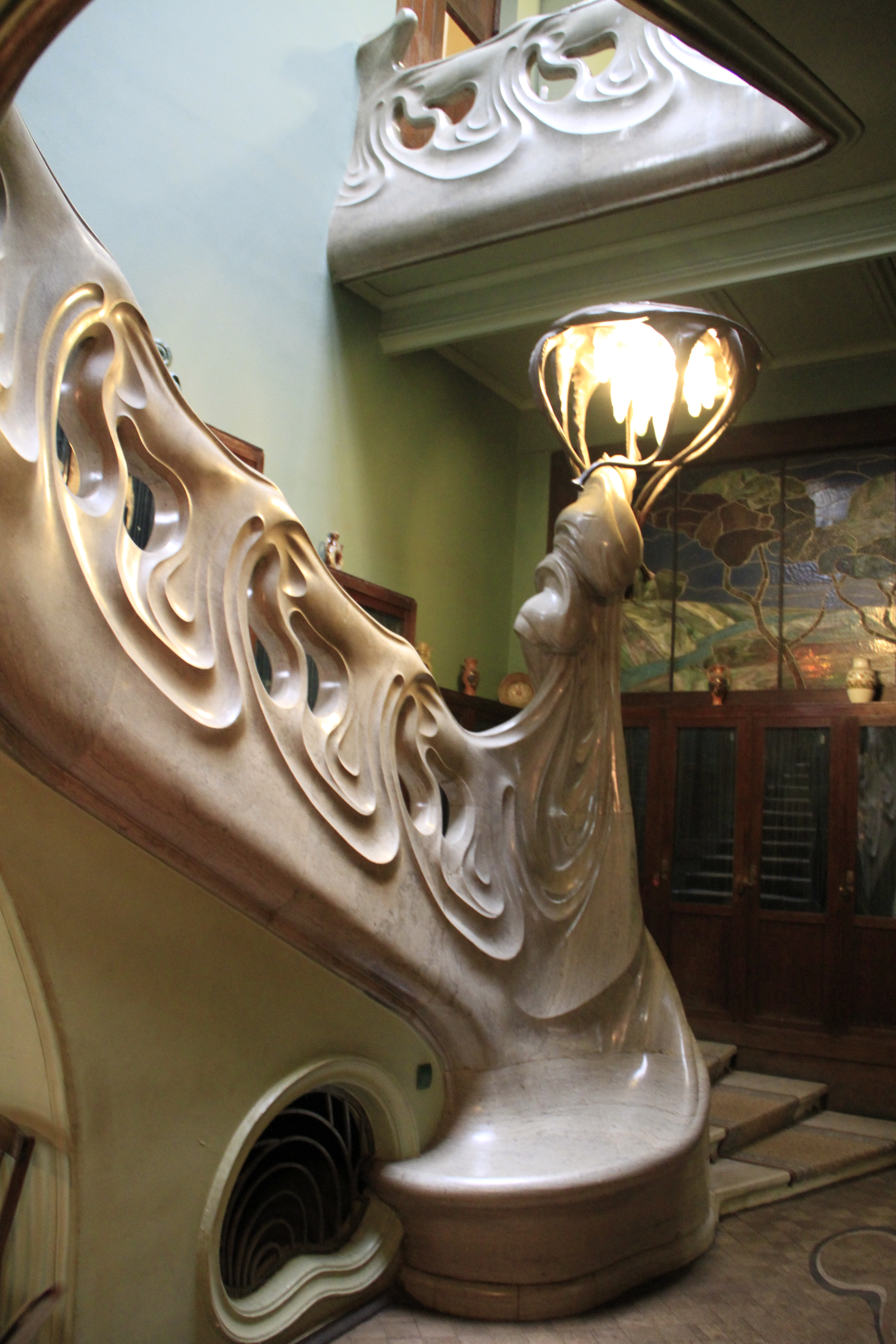
Main staircase of Ryabushinsky House (now Gorky Museum), Moscow by Fyodor Schechtel (1900)

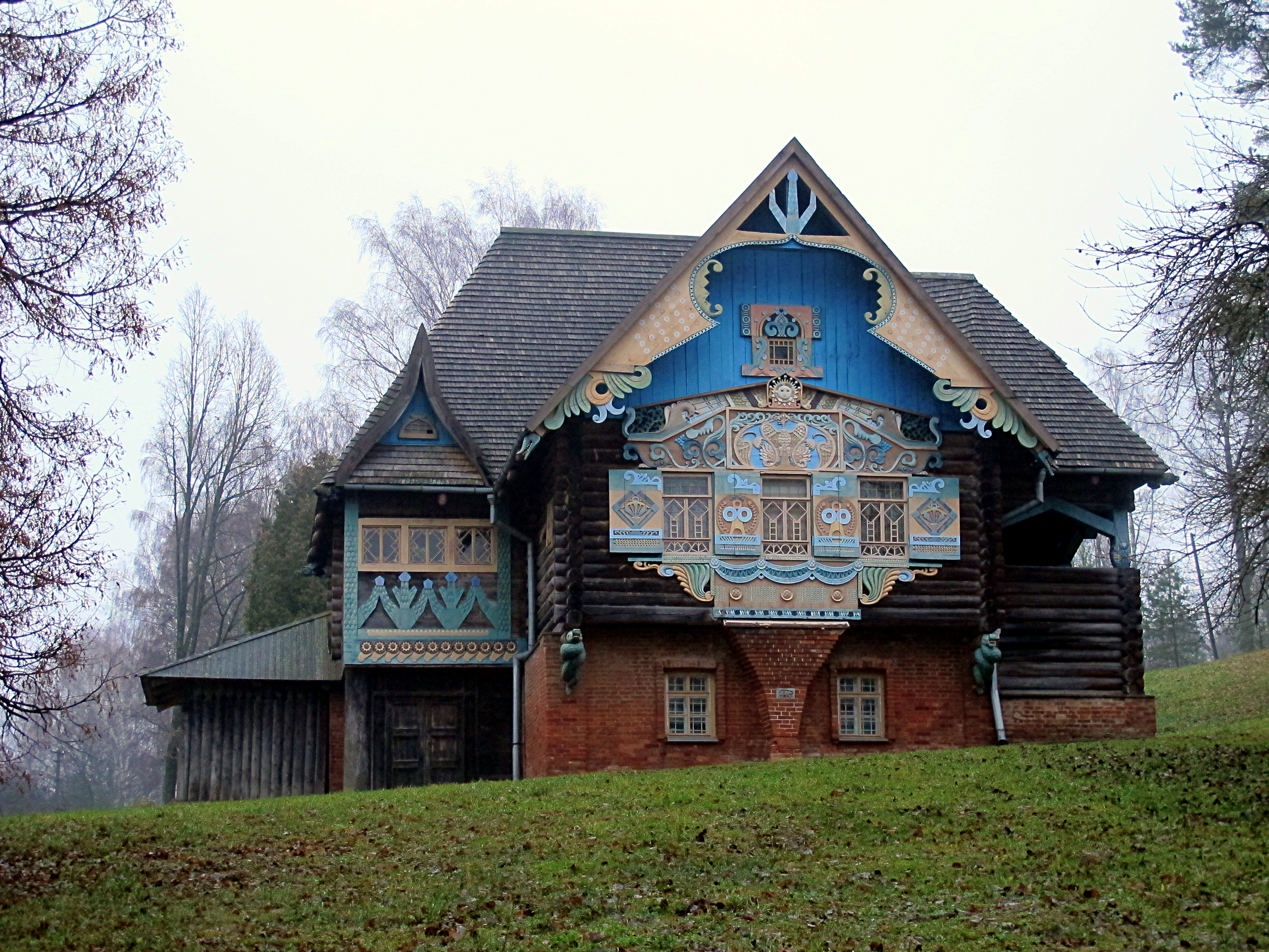
Teremok House in Talashkino, by Sergey Malyutin (1901–1902). Art Nouveau meets Russian Revival style

Art Nouveau is an international style of art, architecture and applied arts, especially the decorative arts, that was most popular between 1893 and 1910. In the Russian language it is called Art Nouveau or Modern (in Cyrillic: Ар-нувo, Моде́рн).

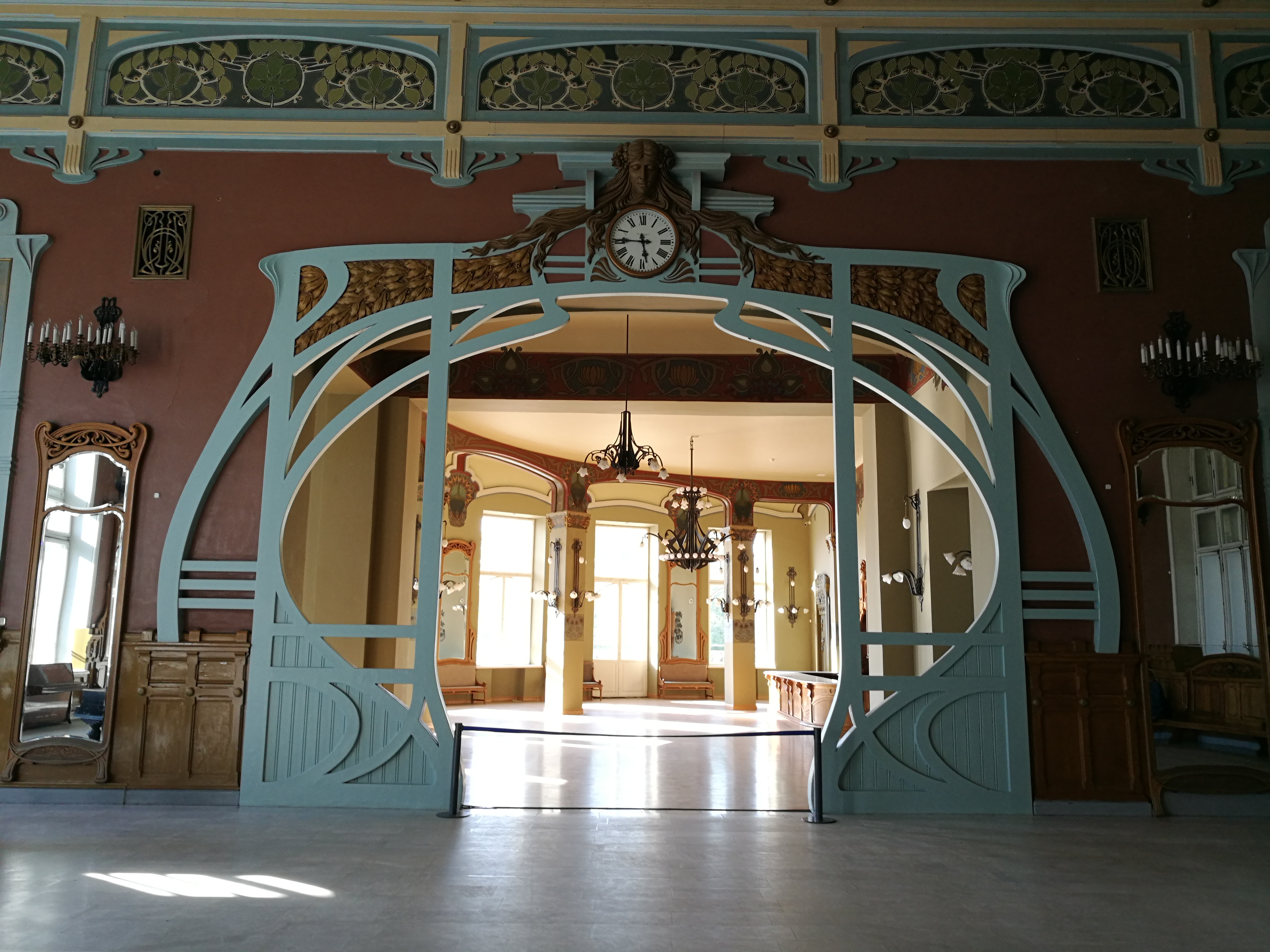
Vitebsky railway station, by Sima Mihash and Stanislav Brzozowski (1904)

Art Nouveau architecture in Russia was mostly built in large cities by merchants and Old Believers, and was highly influenced by the contemporary movements that constituted the Art Nouveau style: the Glasgow School, Jugendstil of Germany, Vienna Secession, as well as Russian Revival architecture and the National Romantic style of Nordic countries (one of which, Grand Duchy of Finland, was a part of Russian Empire) In some Russian towns, there also were earlier examples of wooden architecture, the architecture of Kievan Rus', which influenced the style.

Some Russian Art Nouveau buildings were built on territories that were part of Germany and the Grand Duchy of Finland during the Art Nouveau period and were ceded to the Soviet Union after World War II. Russian architects also worked on the development of Harbin in China after 1898, which explains the presence of Art Nouveau architecture there.

== Saint Petersburg ==
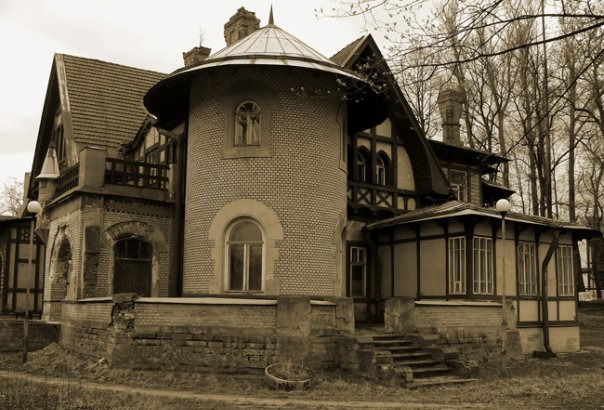
Hauswald summer house – the first Art Nouveau building in Russia

The first Art Nouveau building in Russia was built in Saint Petersburg in 1898. (Note: Some researchers (e.g. Boris Kirikov) note that the first Art Nouveau building in Russia was the estate of Grand Duke Boris Vladimirovich in Tsarskoye Selo that was built in 1896–1897Kirikov, Boris (2014). Architecture of Art Nouveau in Saint Petersburg. Estates and Tenement Houses (in Russian). Saint Petersburg: Kolo. pp. 15–27. ISBN 978-5-4462-0044-3.) It was Hauswald summer house built by Vladimir Chagin and Vasily (Wilhelm) Schoene.

As Saint Petersburg was situated close to the border with Grand Duchy of Finland, there was a strong influence of its National Romantic style on Art Nouveau Architecture in Saint Petersburg. This style is called "Severny modern" in Russia (in Cyrillic: Северный модерн) meaning "Northern Art Nouveau". But European movements influenced local architecture as well.

=== Notable examples ===
Seven Saint Petersburg buildings (Note: One masterpiece is the interior of Grand Hotel Europe rather than a building itself) are sometimes considered as notable examples of Art Nouveau, all by different architects:

- Eliseyev Emporium by Gavriil Baranovsky (1903),
- Whiplash motifs at the Vitebsky railway station by Sima Mihash and Stanislav Brzozowski (1904),
- Singer House by Pavel Suzor (1904),
- Duke of Leuchtenberg apartments by Fyodor von Postels (1904–1905), which includes a facade-wide frieze by Sergei Schelkovy,
- Kshessinskaya House by Alexander von Hohen (1904–1906),
- Lidval apartments by Fyodor Lidval (also known as Johan Fredrik Lidvall, 1899–1904),
- Basseynaya Condominium by Ernest Wirrich, Aleksei Zazersky, Nikolai Vasilyev, Alexey Bubyr (1912–1917).
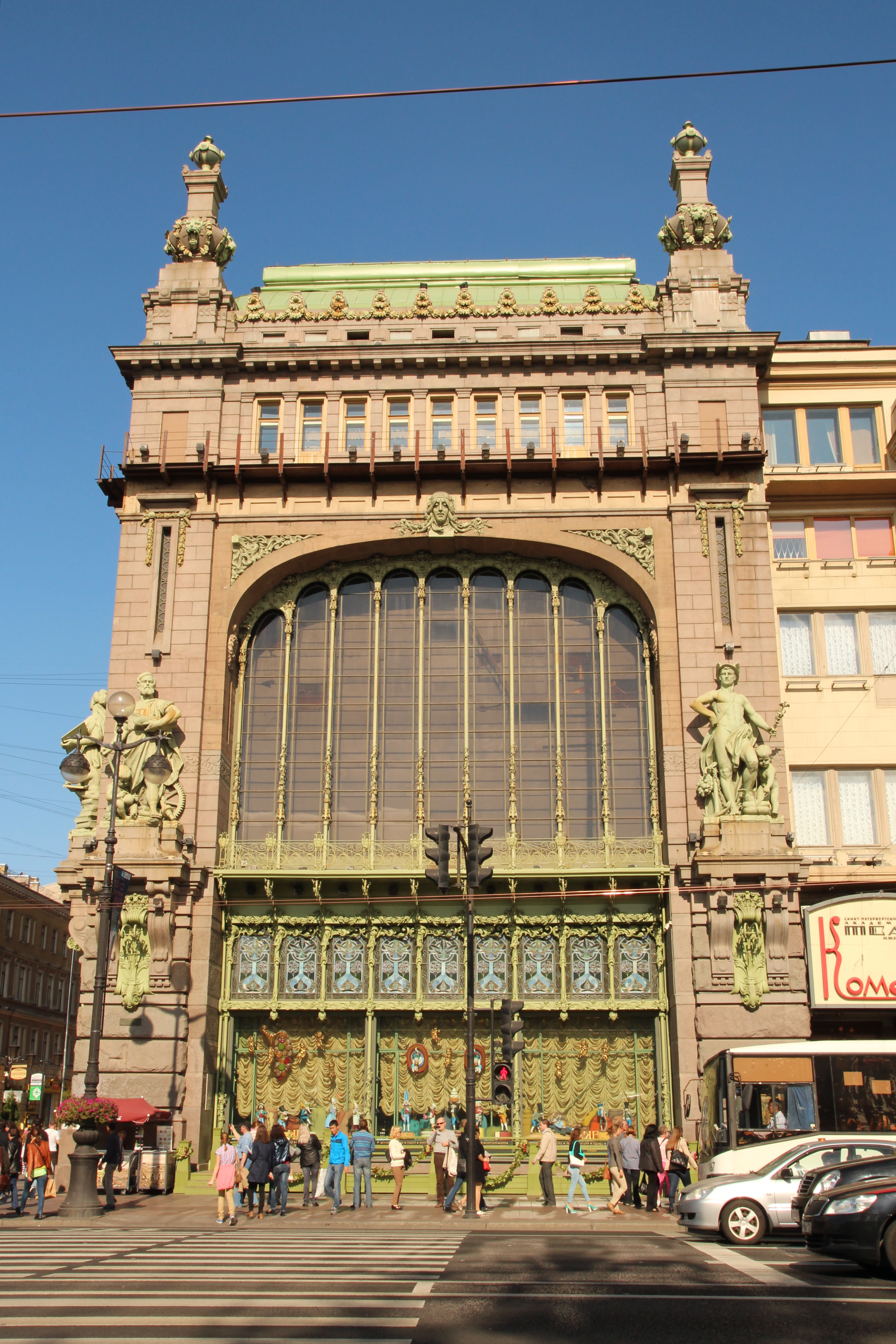
Eliseyev Emporium

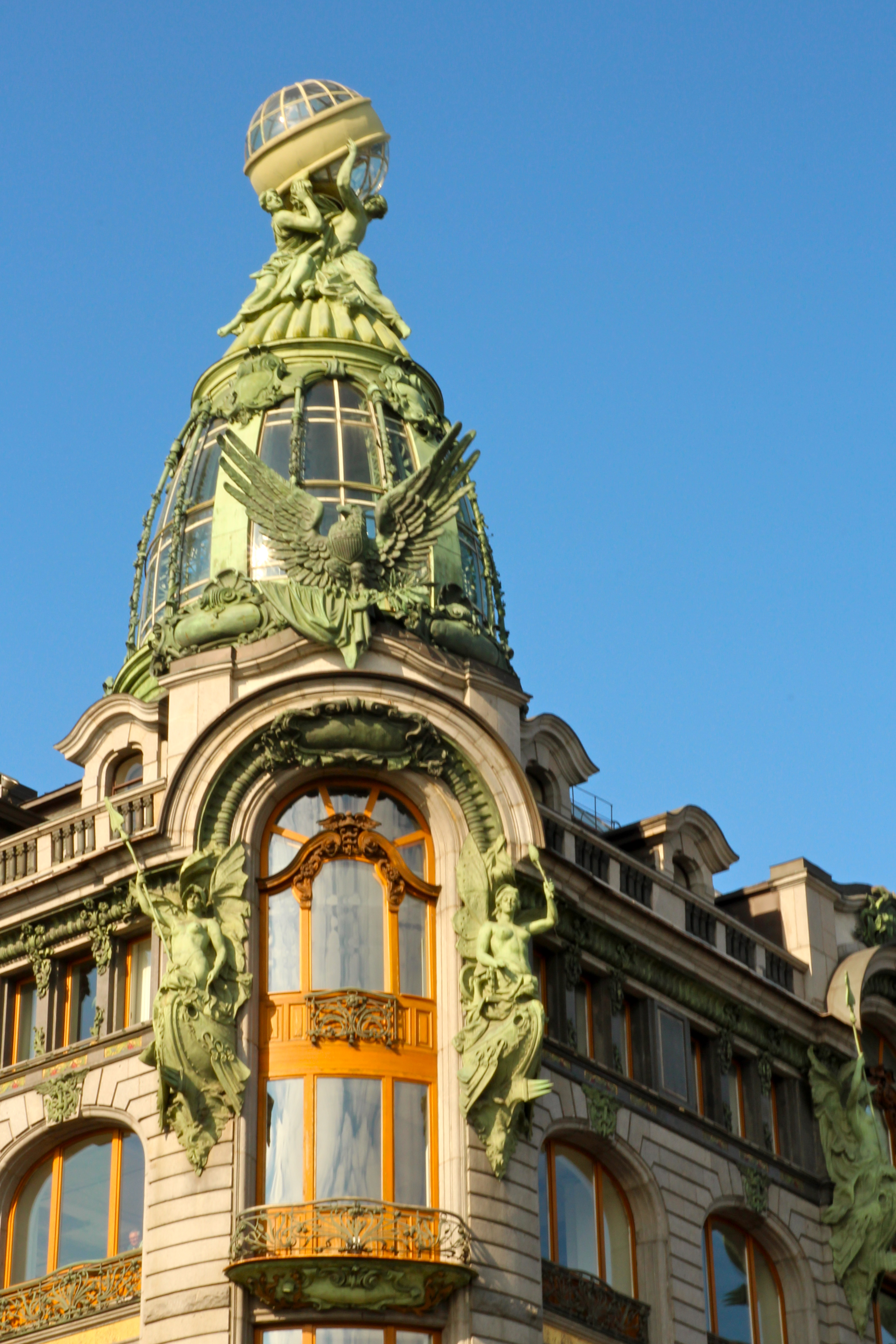
Singer House Dome

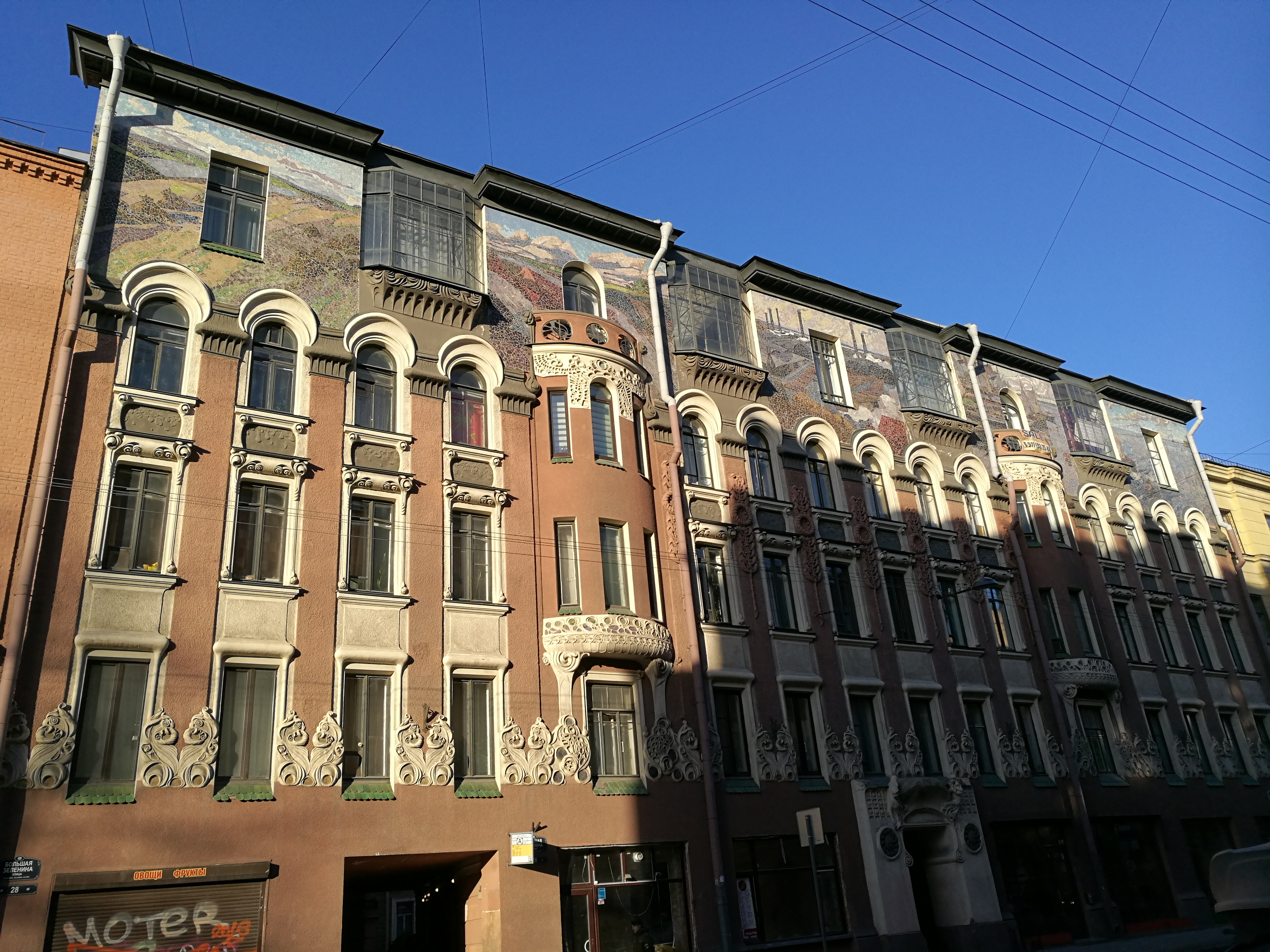
Duke of Leuchtenberg apartments

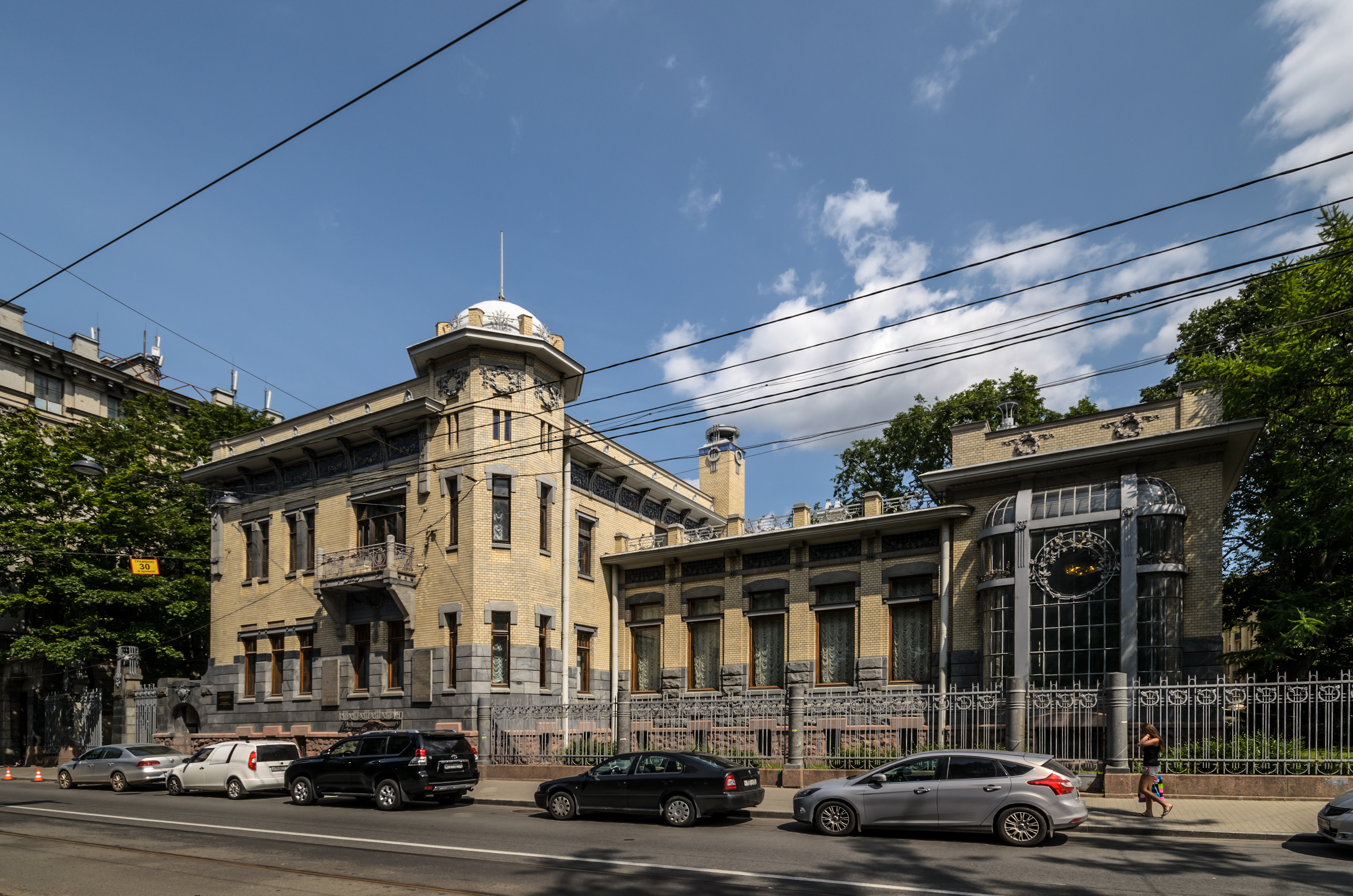
Kshessinskaya House

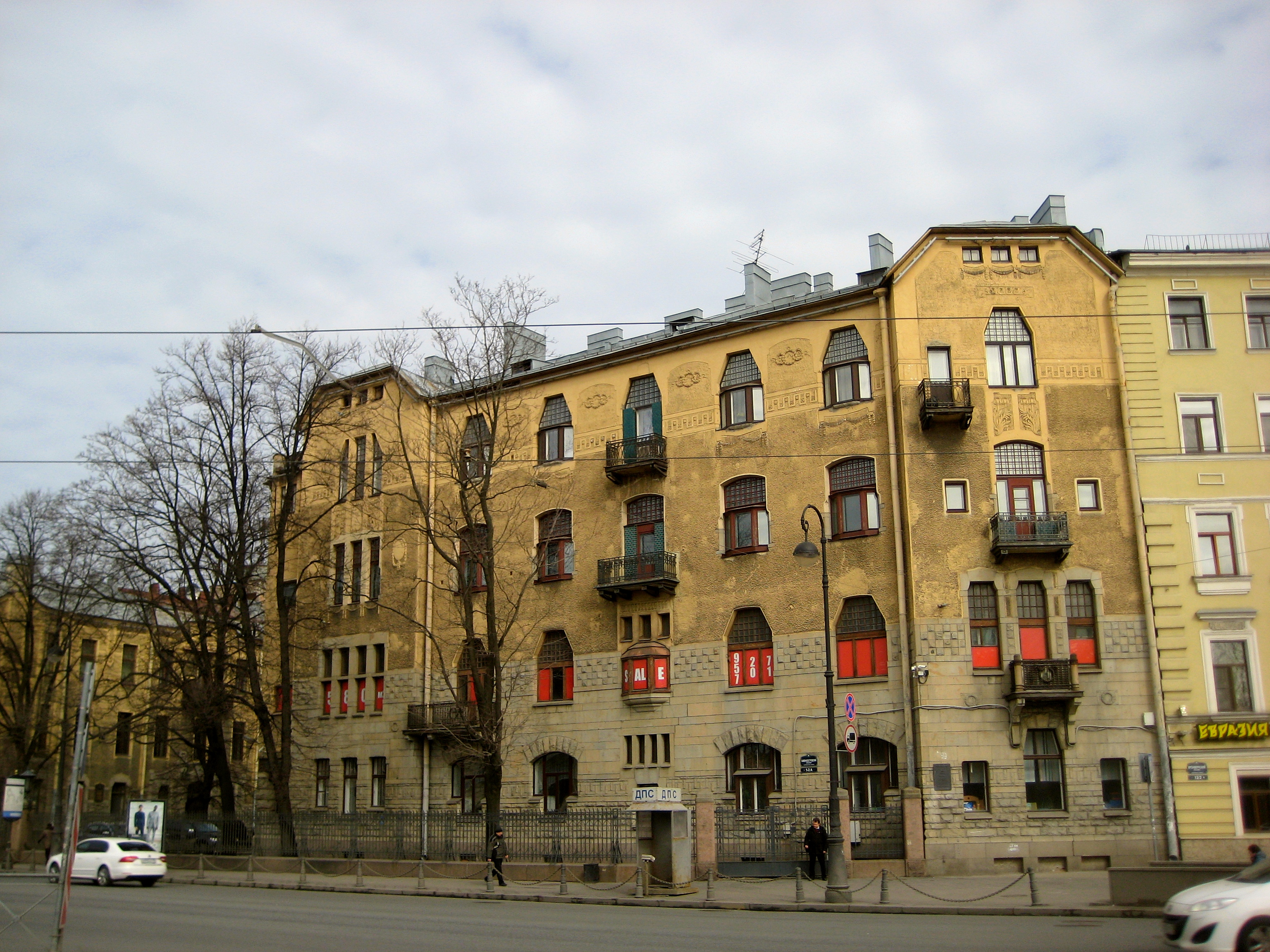
Lidval apartments

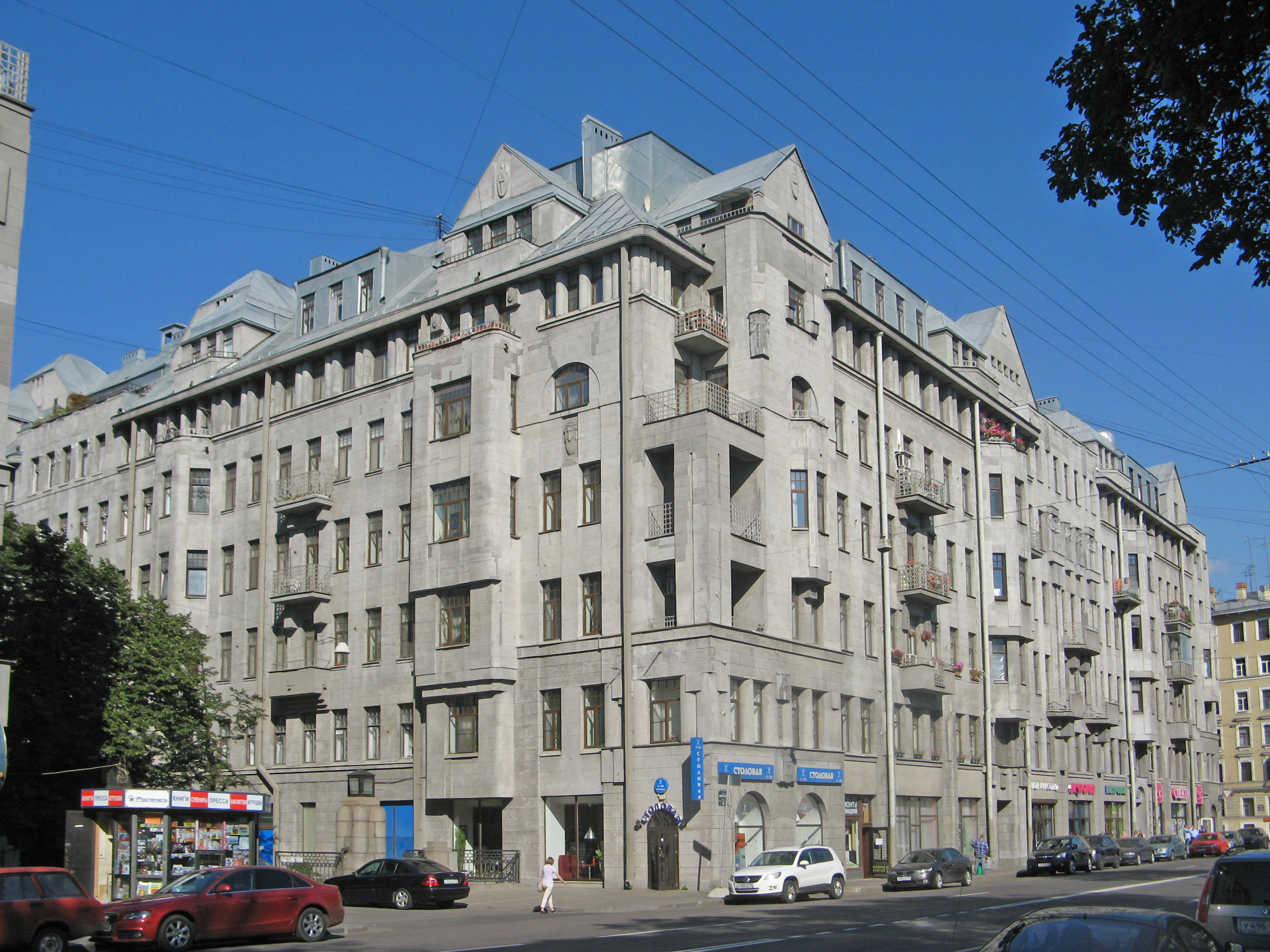
Basseynaya Condominium

=== National Romantic style ===
The last two building are examples of Nordic National Romantic style. Other notable examples of that movement are:

- Roman Catholic Church of Our Lady of Lourdes by Leon Benois and Marian Peretyatkovich (1903–1909),
- Putilova Apartments (also known as House with owls) by Hyppolit Pretreaus (1906–1907),
- Bubyr' Apartments by Aleksei Bubyr and Nikolai Vasilyev (1907),
- Bolsheokhtinsky Bridge (also known as Peter the Great Bridge) by Vladimir Apyshkov (1908 or 1909–1911),
- "New Passage" Trade house by Nikolai Vasilyev (1912–1913),
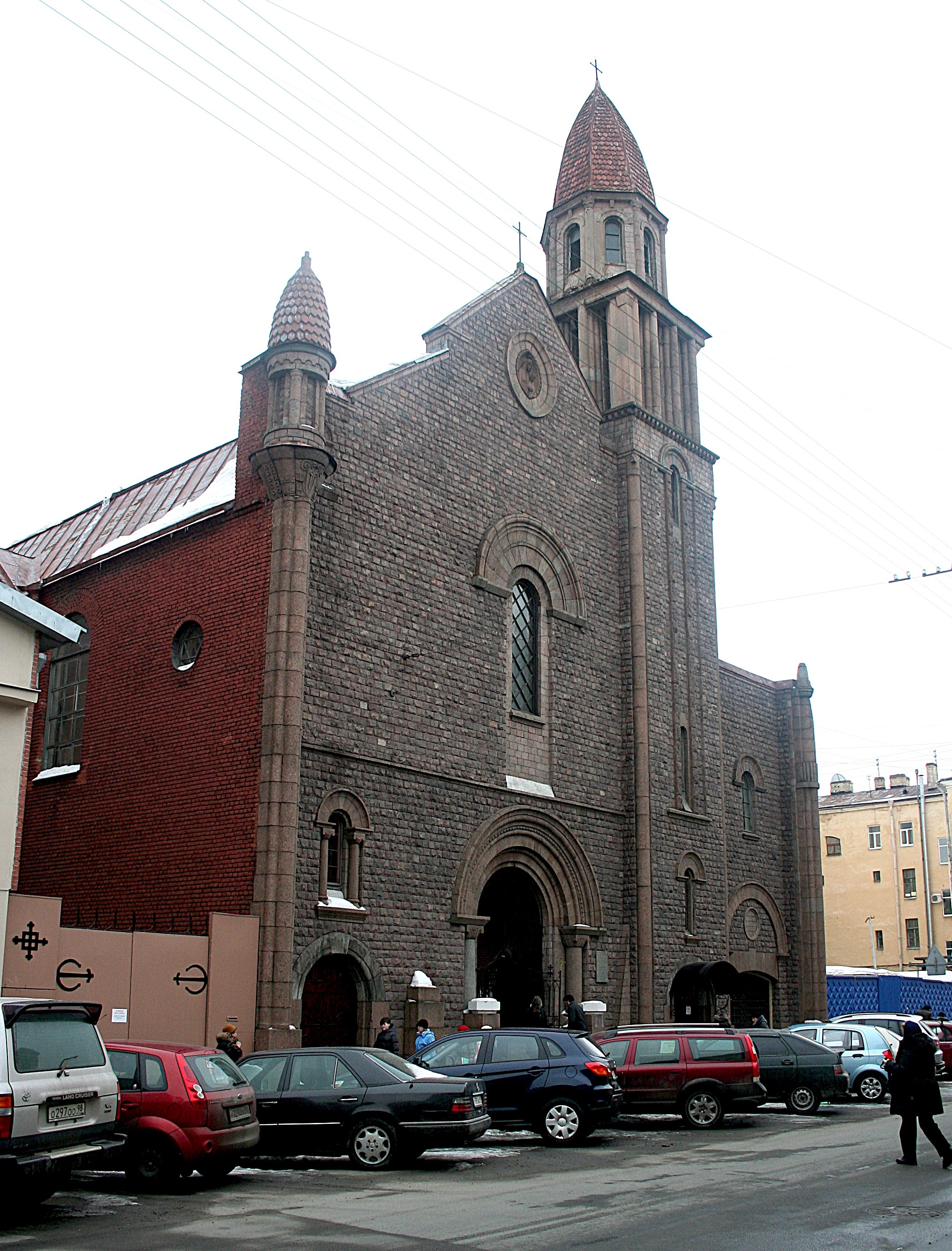
Church of Our Lady of Lourdes

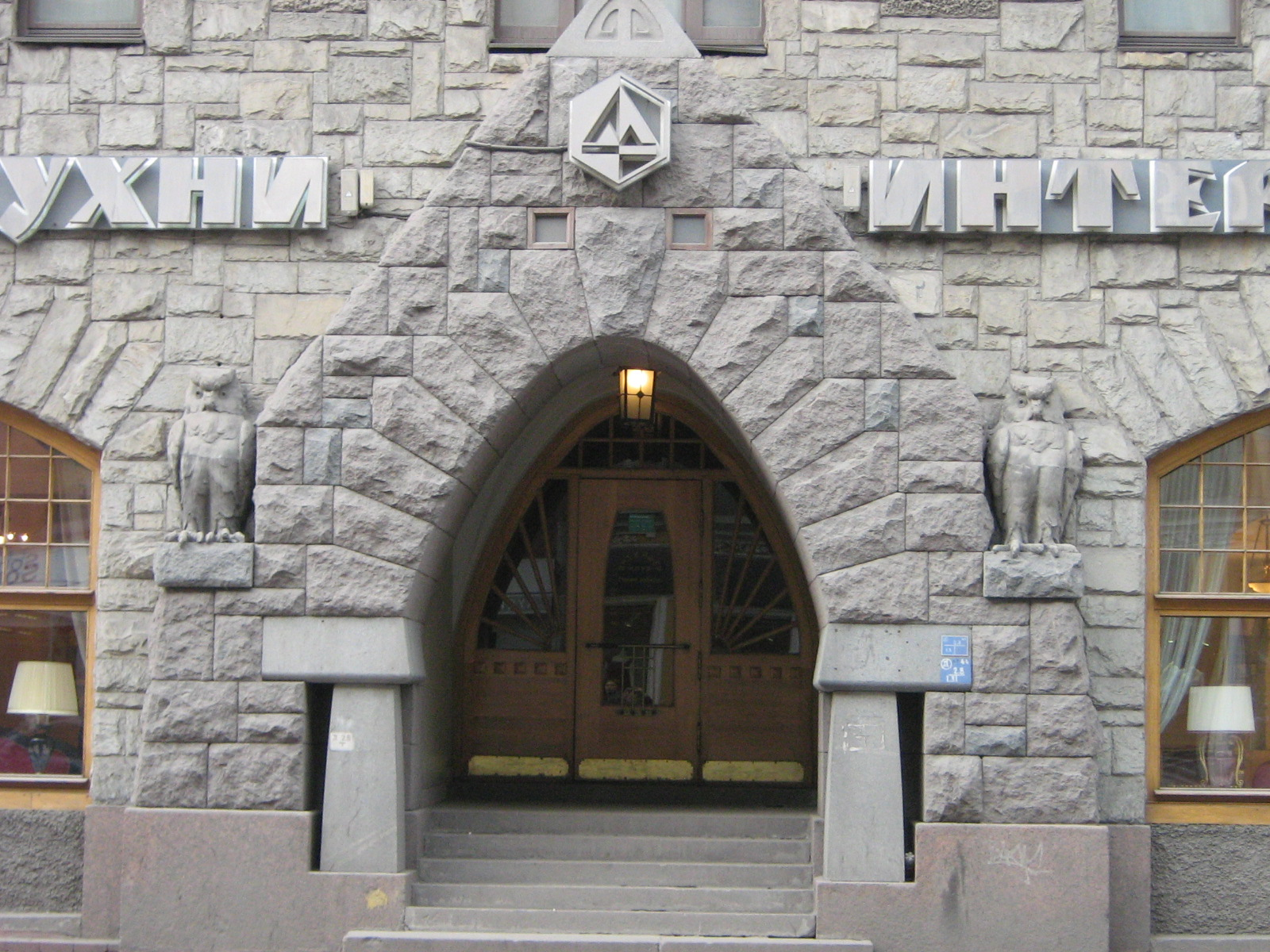
Portal of Putilova Apartments

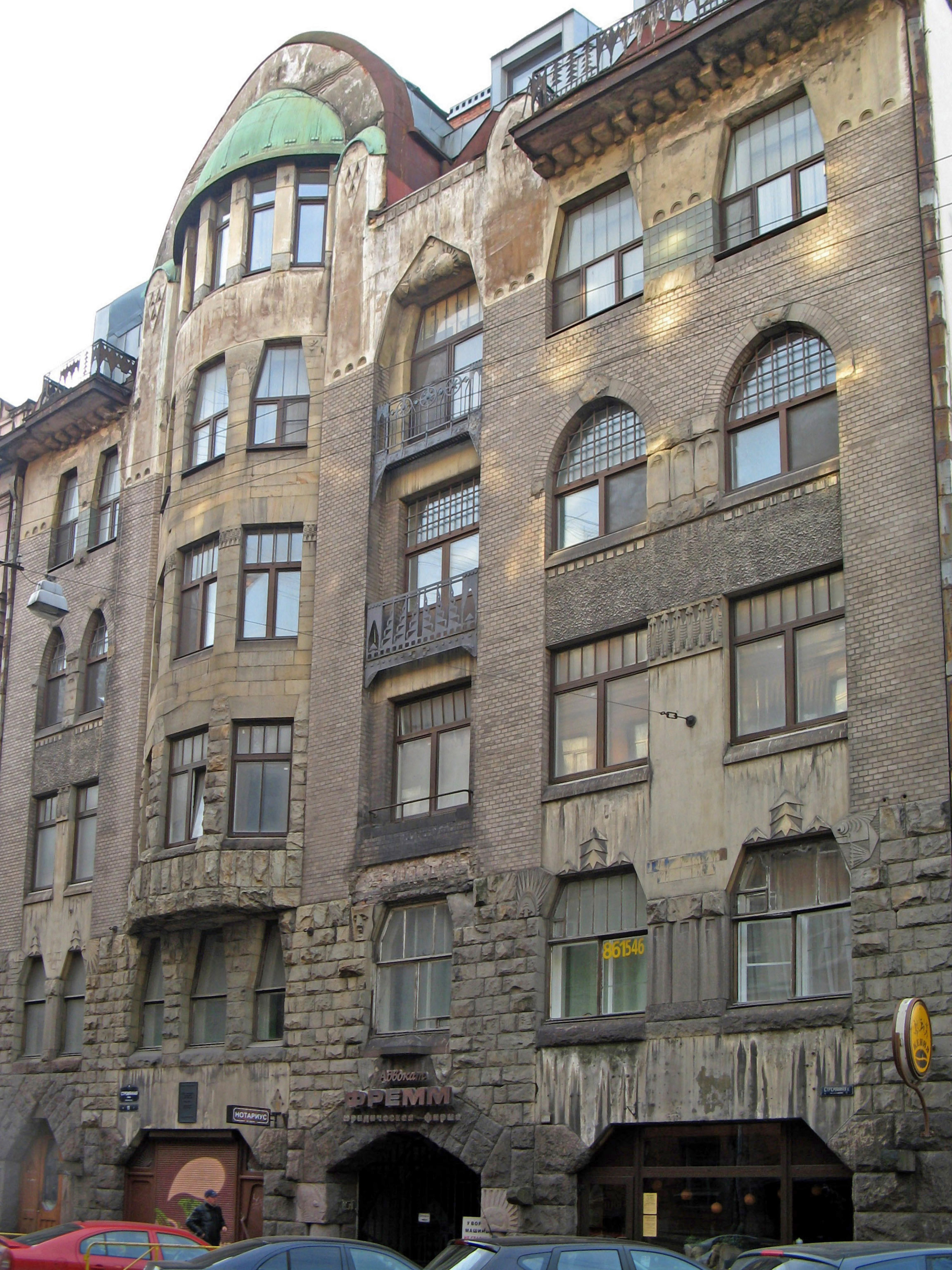
Bubyr' Apartments

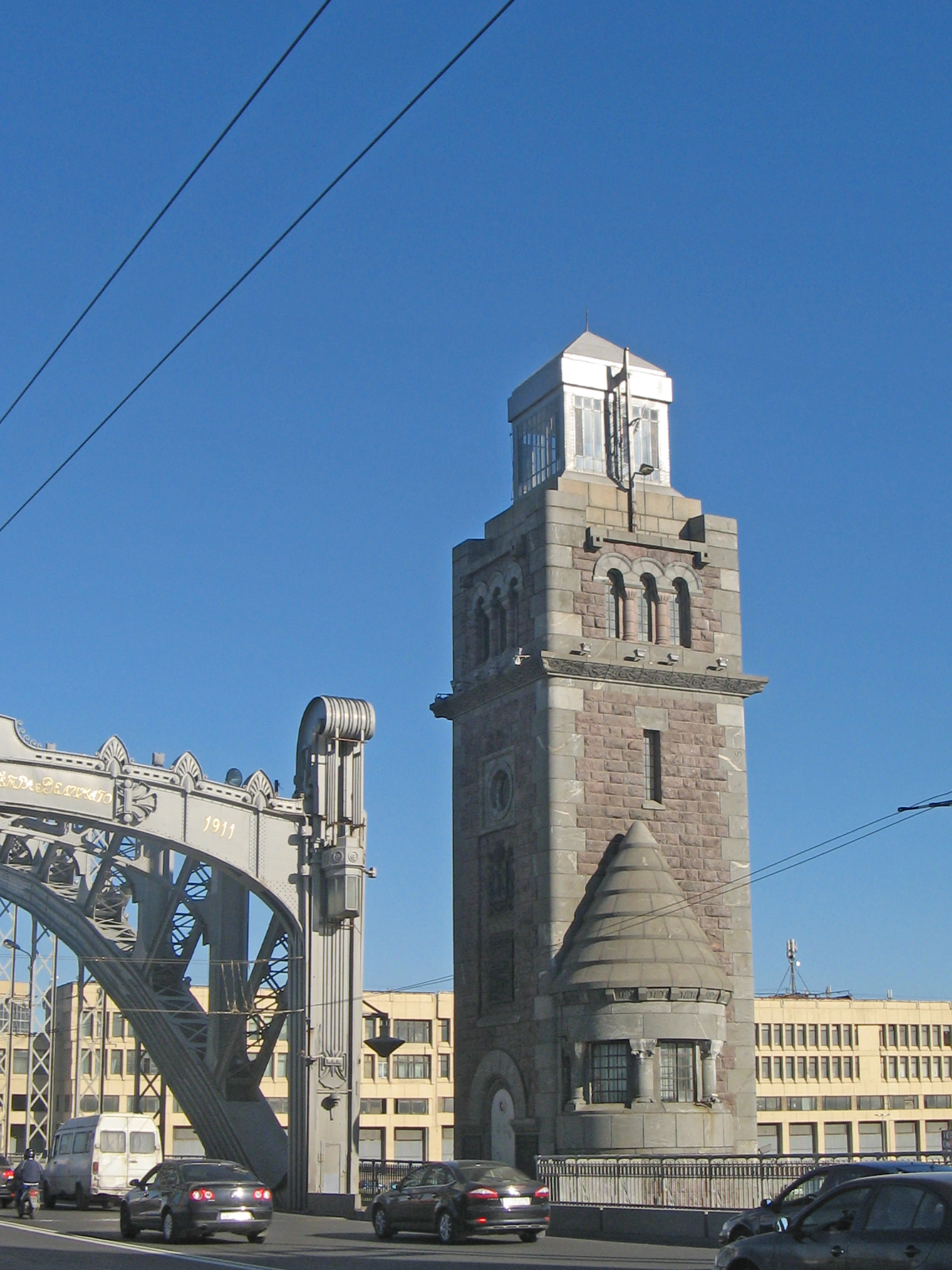
Bolsheokhtinsky Bridge

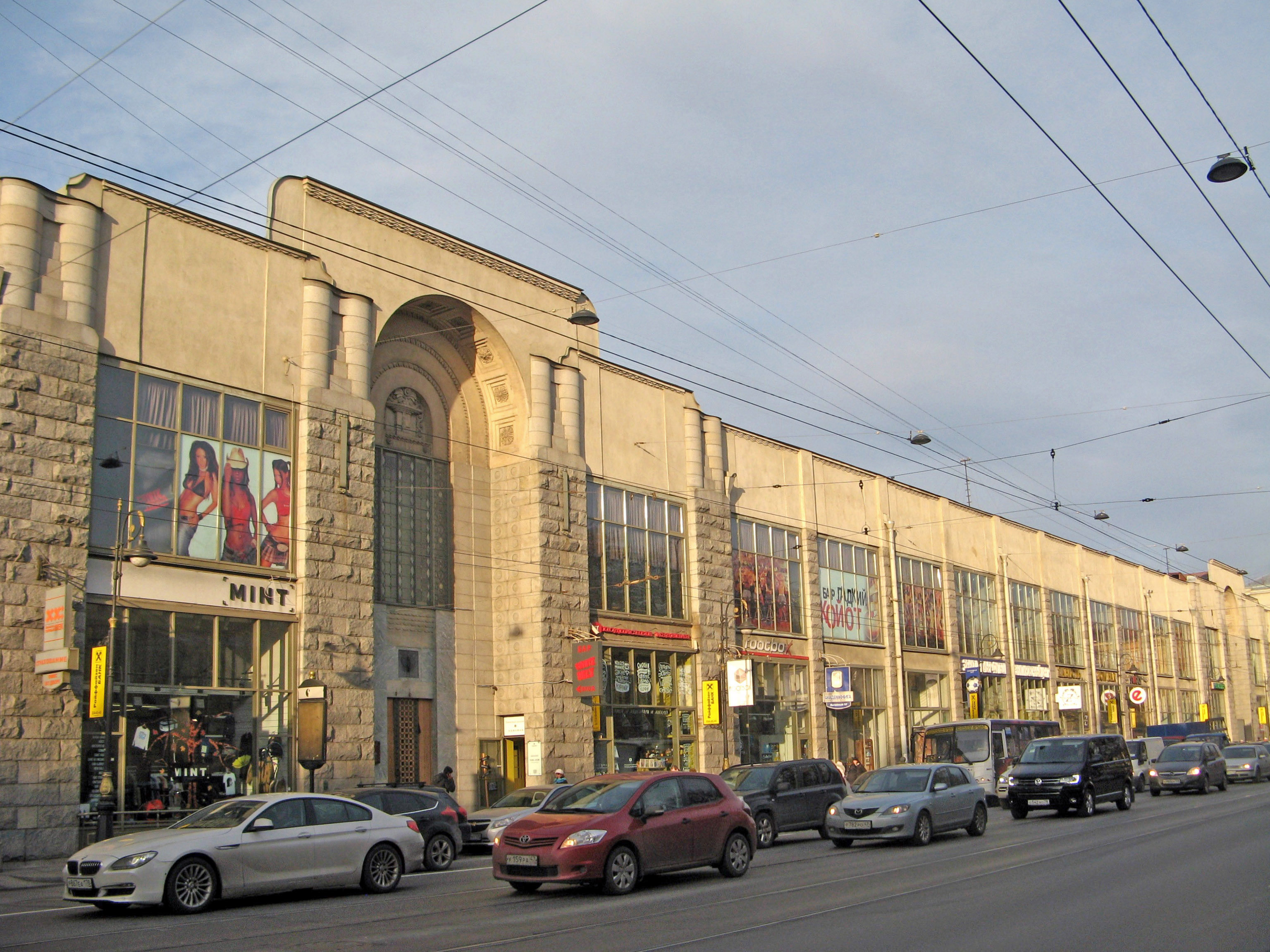
"New Passage" Trade house

=== Islamic Revival architecture ===
The Saint Petersburg Mosque (1910–1921), designed by the architect Nikolai Vasilyev in the Islamic Revival style, is modelled after the mosque of Gur-e-Amir, the tomb of Tamerlane in Samarkand (14th century).

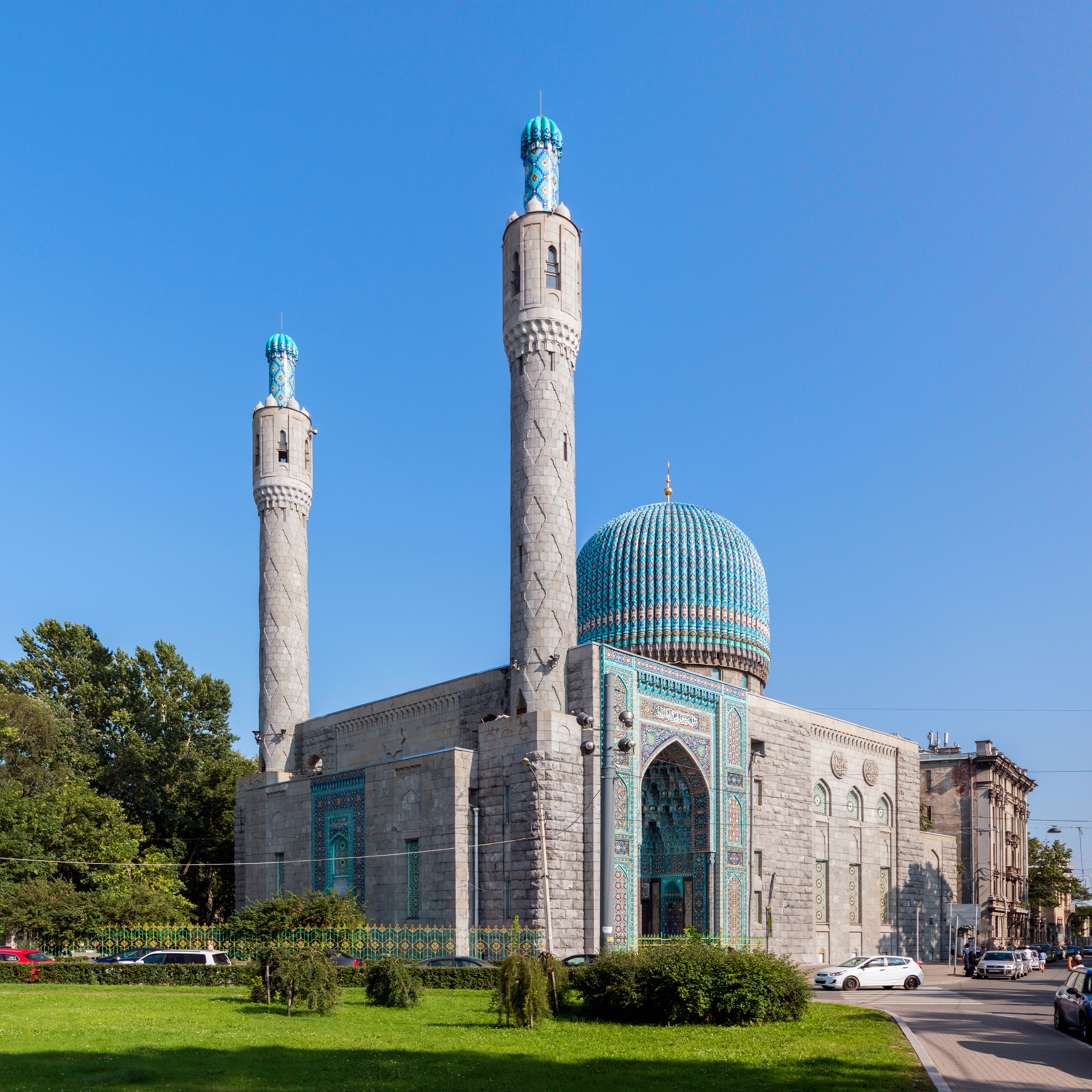
Saint Petersburg Mosque, by Nikolai Vasilyev (1921)

=== Russian Revival influence ===
Many Russian Orthodox churches constructed in the Art Nouveau period are primarily examples of Russian Revival architecture, though they often include some modern elements. In Saint Petersburg these are:

- The Old Believers Church of Our Lady of the Sign by Dmitry Kryzanowski (1906–1907),
- The Church of Peter the Metropolitan by Andrey Aplaksin (1907).
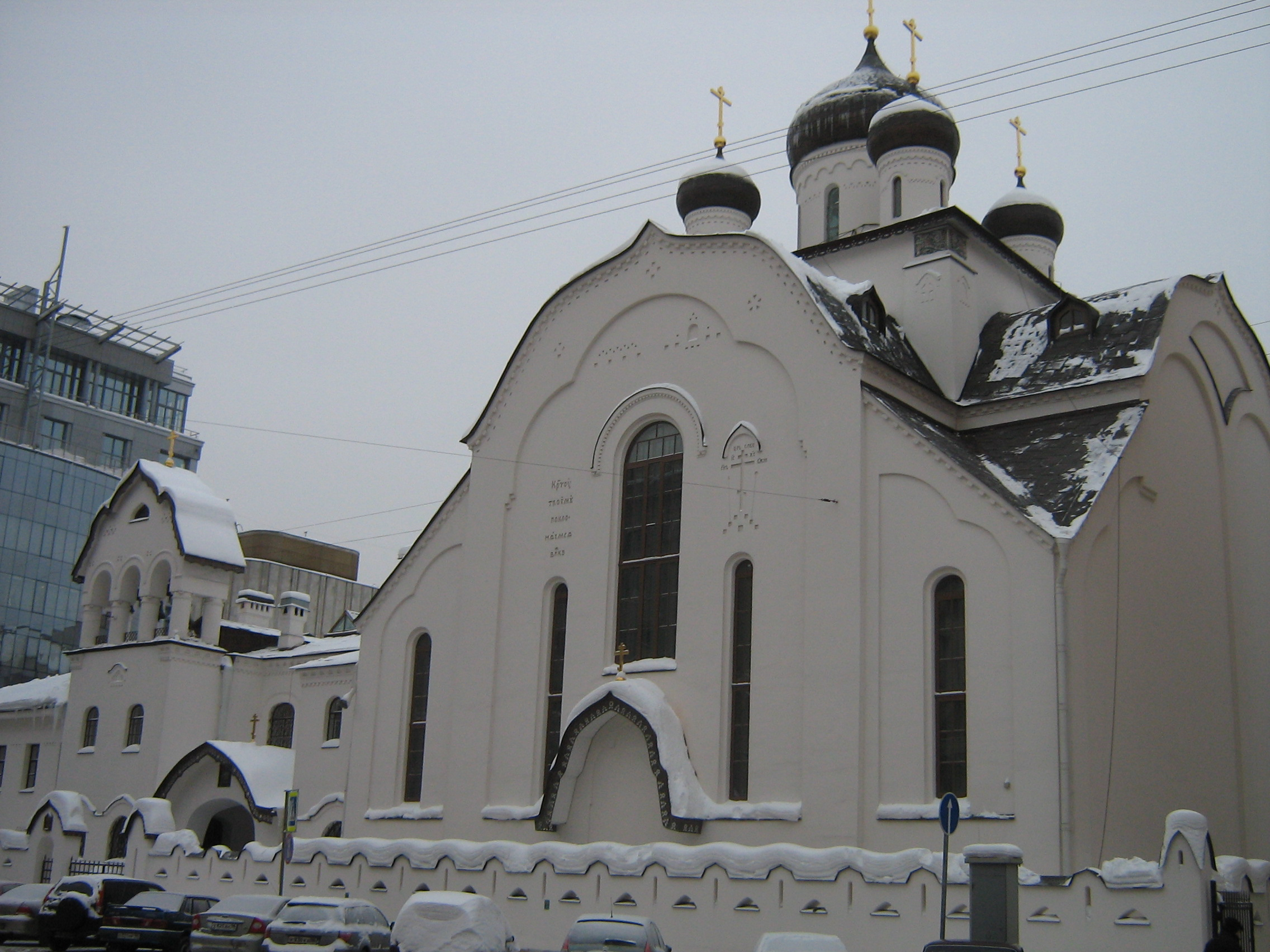
Church of Our Lady of the Sign by Dmitry Kryzanowski (1906–1907)

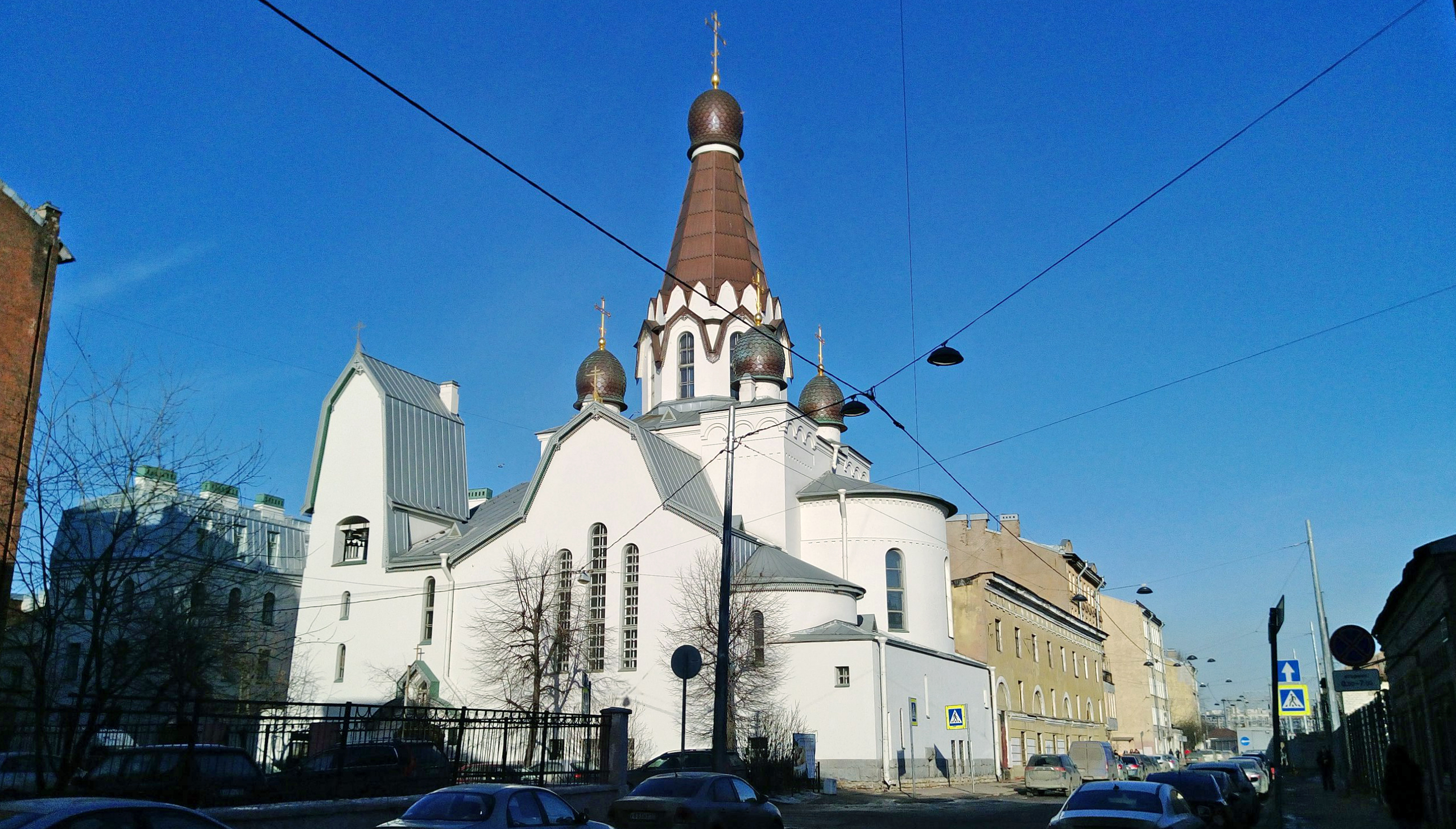
The Church of Peter the Metropolitan by Andrey Aplaksin (1907)

== Moscow ==
=== Lev Kekushev ===
One of first Art Nouveau buildings in Moscow was the List House (1898–99) by Lev Kekushev. Kekushev was acquainted with Victor Horta, the initiator of Art Nouveau movement, and the house shows the natural curving forms, open interiors and floral designs of Horta. Kekushev's buildings are notable for his skilful use of ceramic and iron ornaments. His buildings also have a signature feature: a ceramic depiction on the facade or a sculpture of a lion, or 'Lev', after his first name.

Prominent buildings by Lev Kekushev in Art Nouveau style include:

- List House (1898–99)
- Kekushev House, also known as Kekusheva House, as he had to cede it to his ex-wife in settling their divorce, (1900–1903),
- Mindovsky House and Nosov House (both in 1903),
- Isakov Apartments (1904–1906).

Lev Kekushev also took part in the construction of the Hotel Metropol Moscow. In 1898–1899, he won the first prize in the open contest, but the commissioner of the project Savva Morozov discarded the decision of a professional jury and awarded the prize to William Walcot. However, the owners retained Kekushev as an overall project manager. Kekushev's assistance was probably crucial to the final realization of the complex structure.

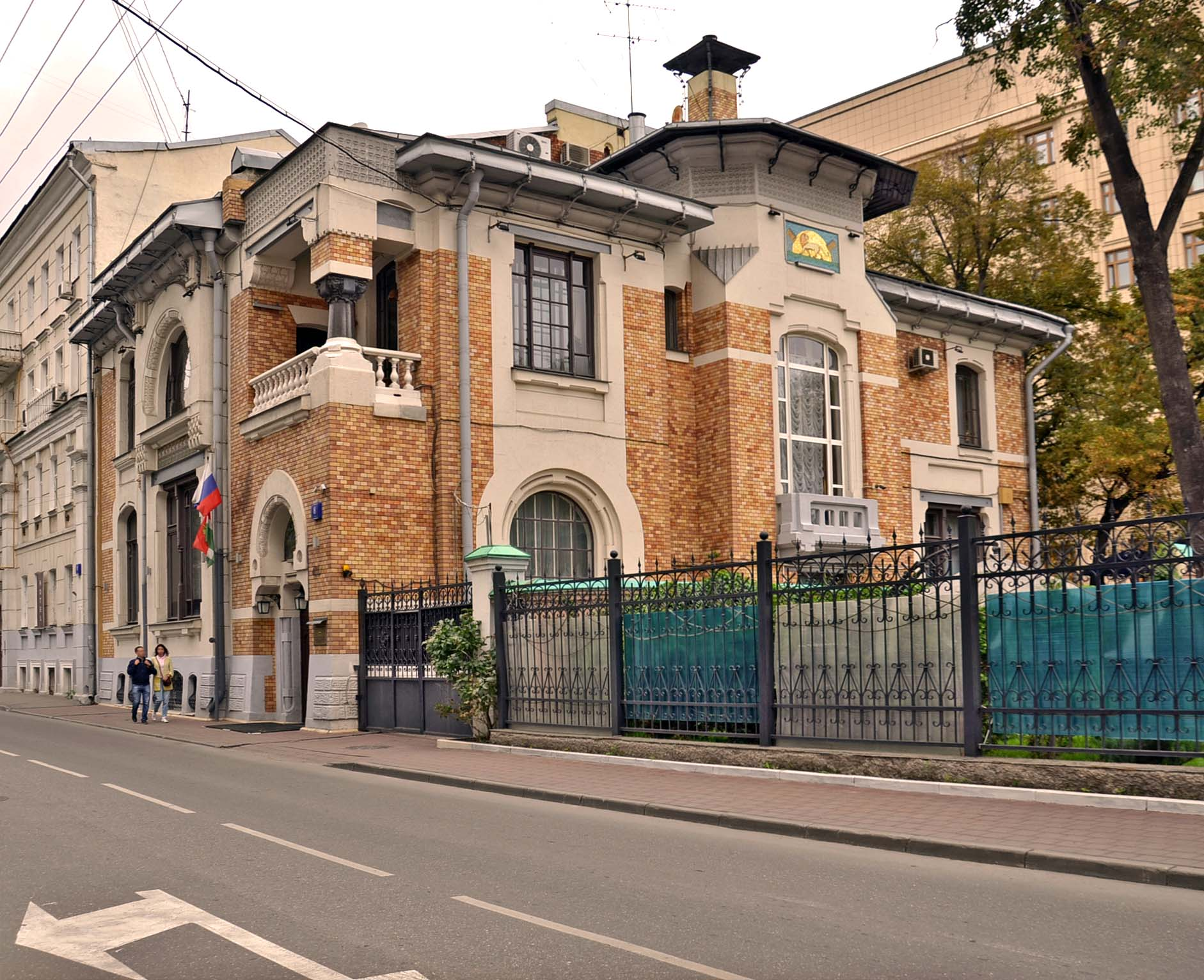
List House (1898–99)

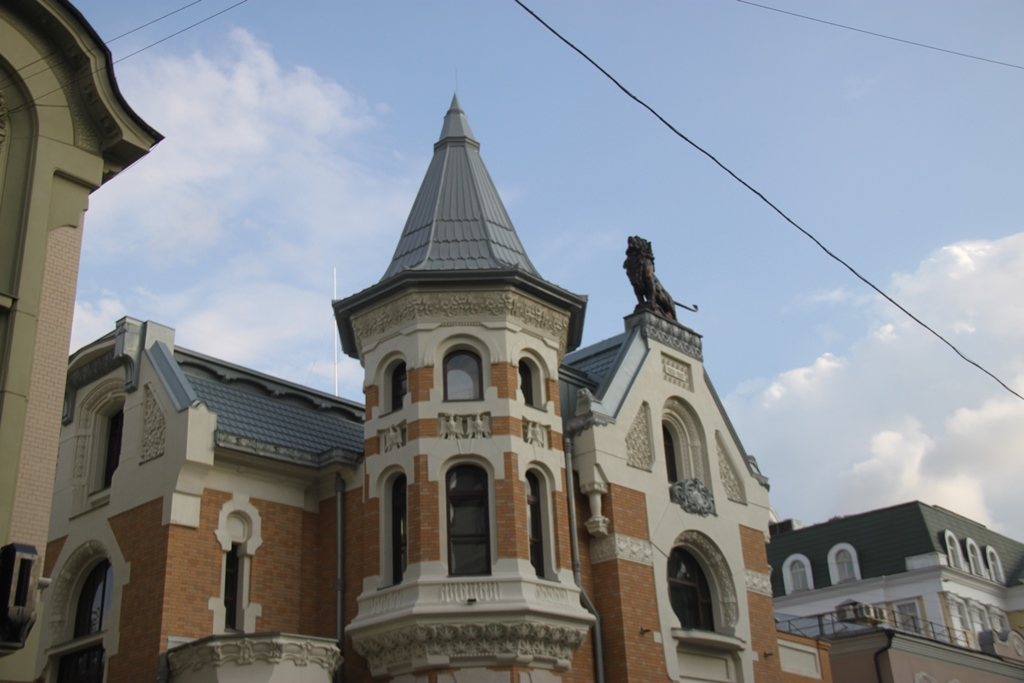
A lion's statue on top of Kekushev House

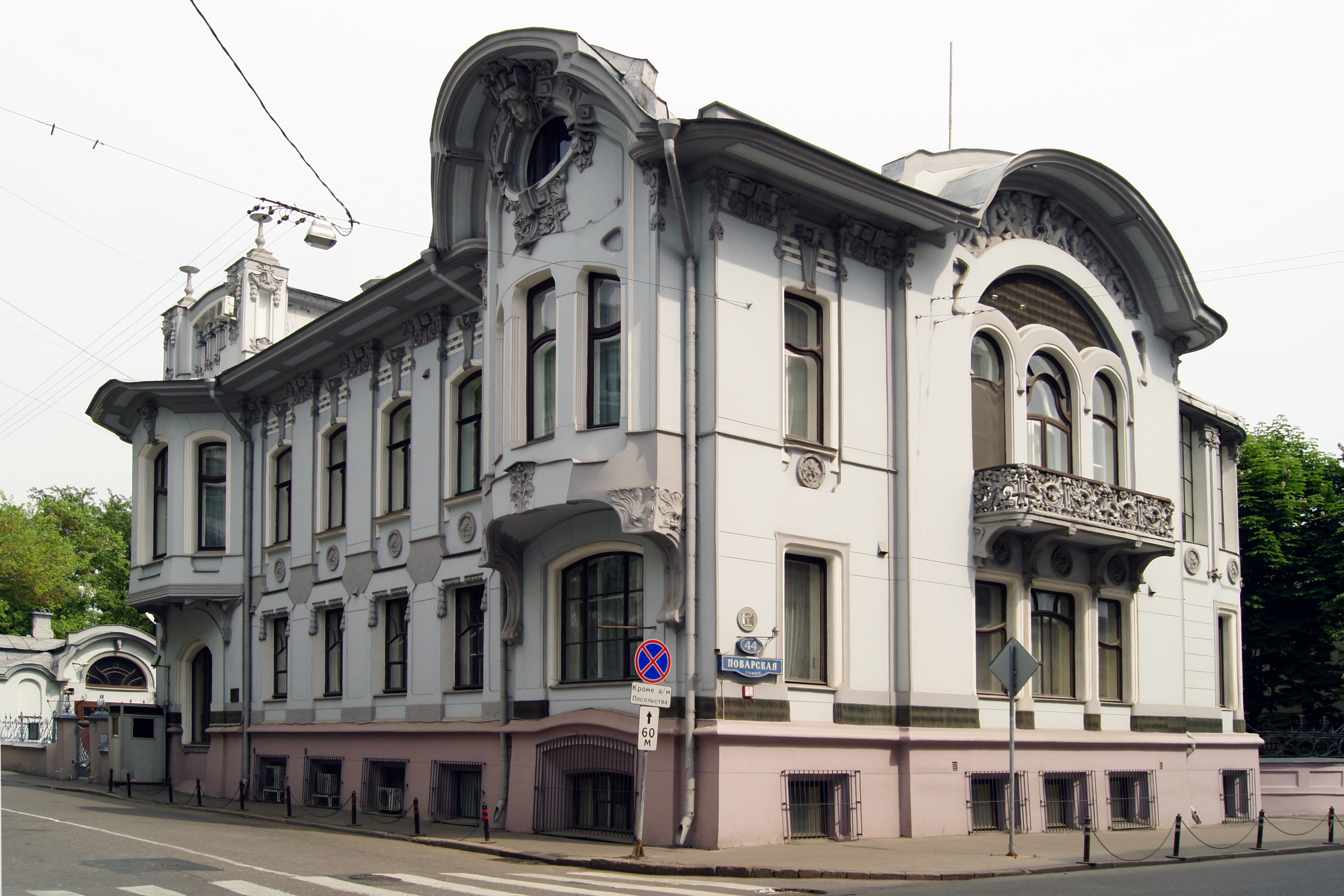
Mindovsky House

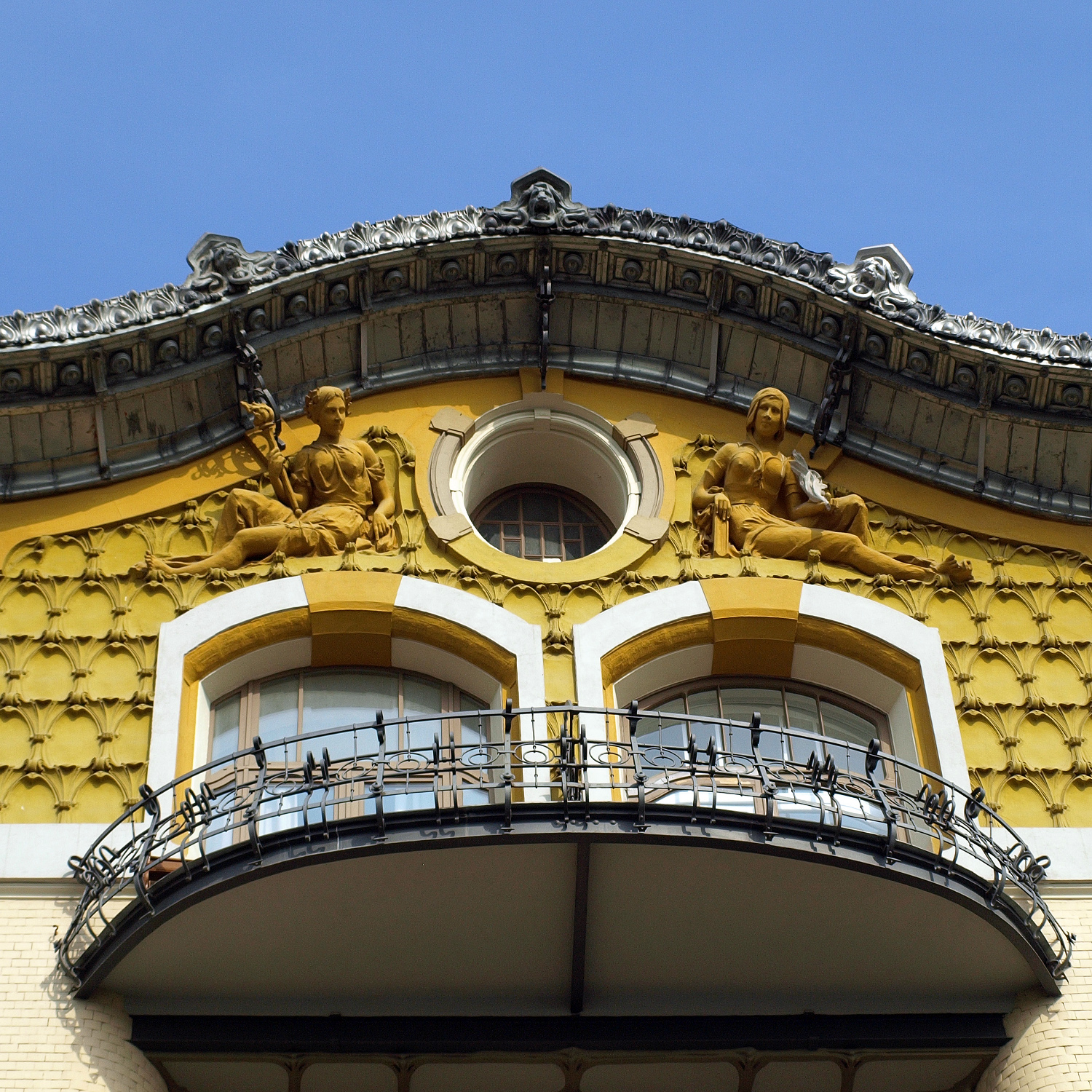
Metal ornament of Isakov Apartments

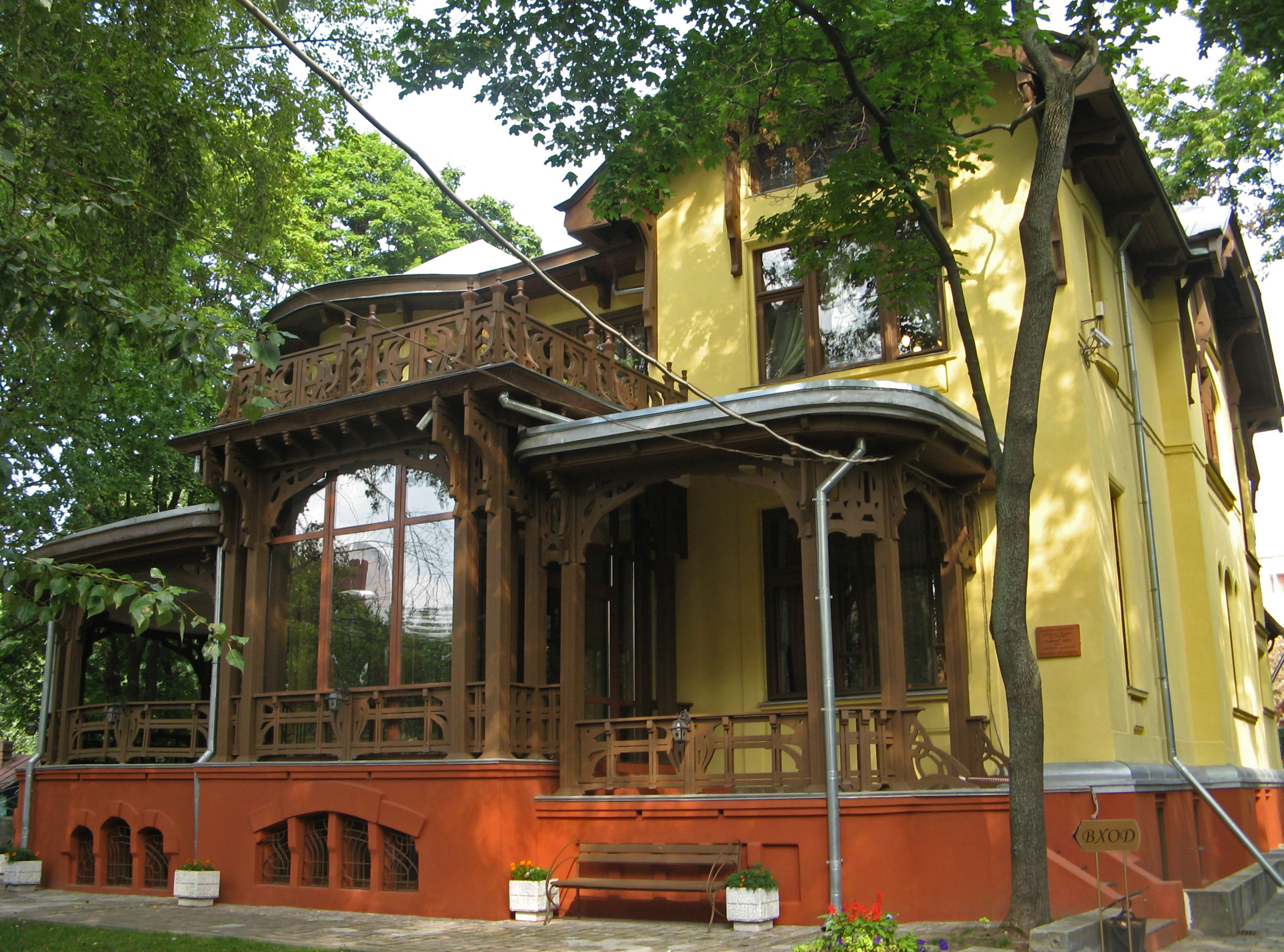
Nosov House

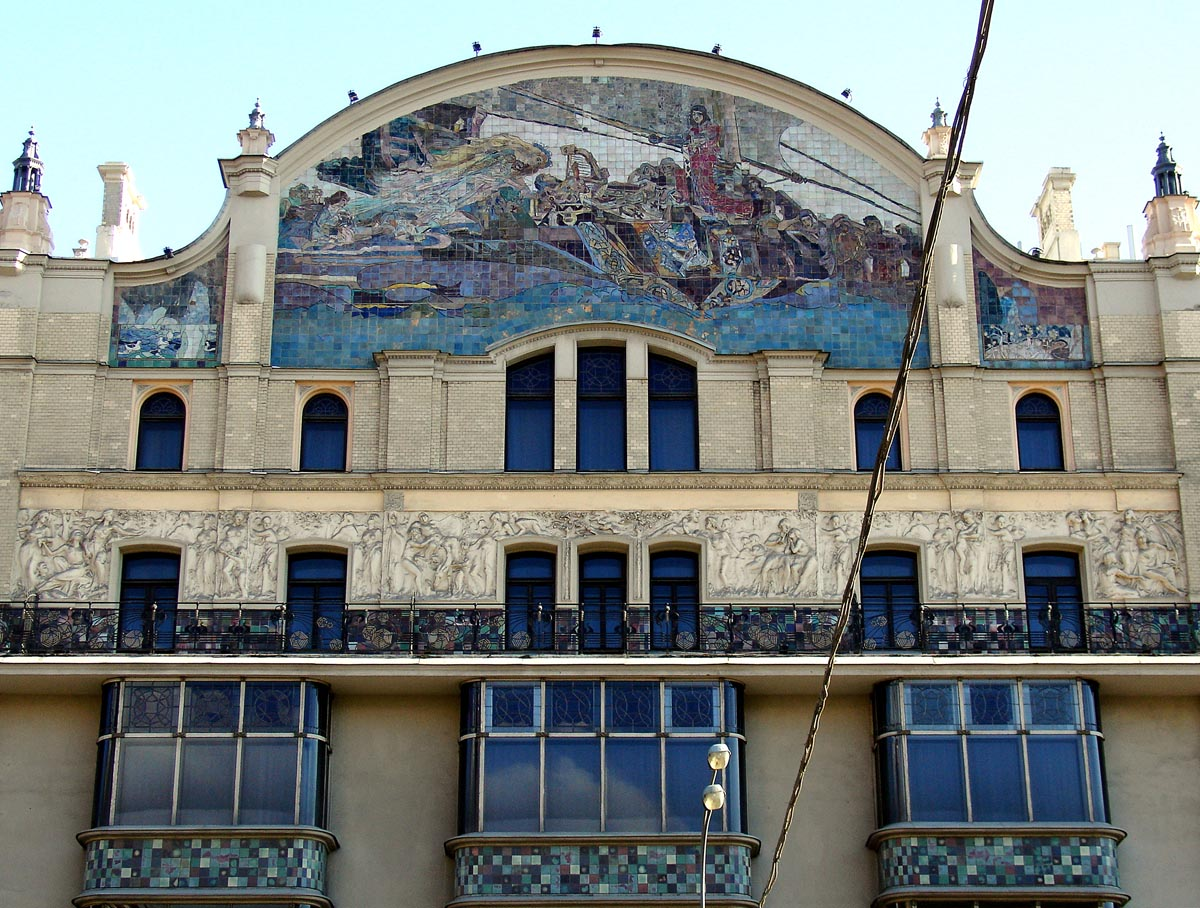
Maiolica panel of Mikhail Vrubel and bas-reliefs at the facade of Hotel Metropol

=== Franz (Fyodor) Schechtel ===
Another influential master of Russian Art Nouveau who worked in Moscow was Franz (Fyodor) Schechtel. Starting his career with Neo-Gothic buildings and finishing career with Neoclassical ones, he built his best-known masterpieces in Art Nouveau style. In 1901 he was commissioned to build the pavilion of Russia at Glasgow Exhibition. There he gained international recognition and got to know Charles Rennie Mackintosh who influenced Schechtel's art. Another influence was Joseph Maria Olbrich, the founder of the Darmstadt Artists' Colony, whose Ludwig Habich House was an inspiration for the Gorky Museum (1900–1903). His other works in Moscow included:

- Derozhinskaya House (1901),
- Yaroslavsky railway station (1902–1904). The Yaroslavsky station was enlarged, with a new facade in Russian Revival style, with elements of Art Nouveau decoration in the interior.
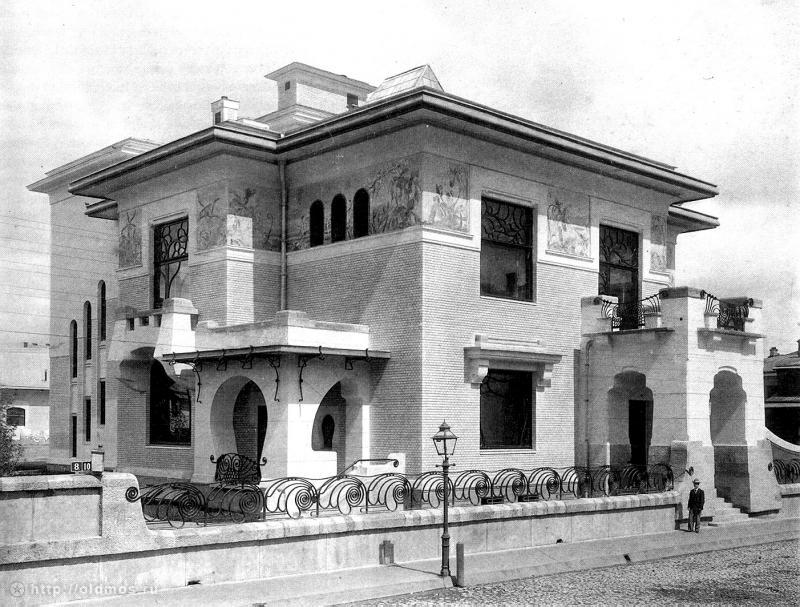
Gorky Museum

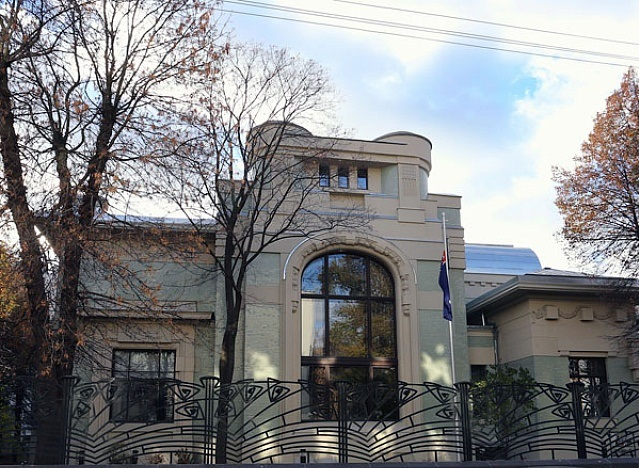
Derozhinskaya House

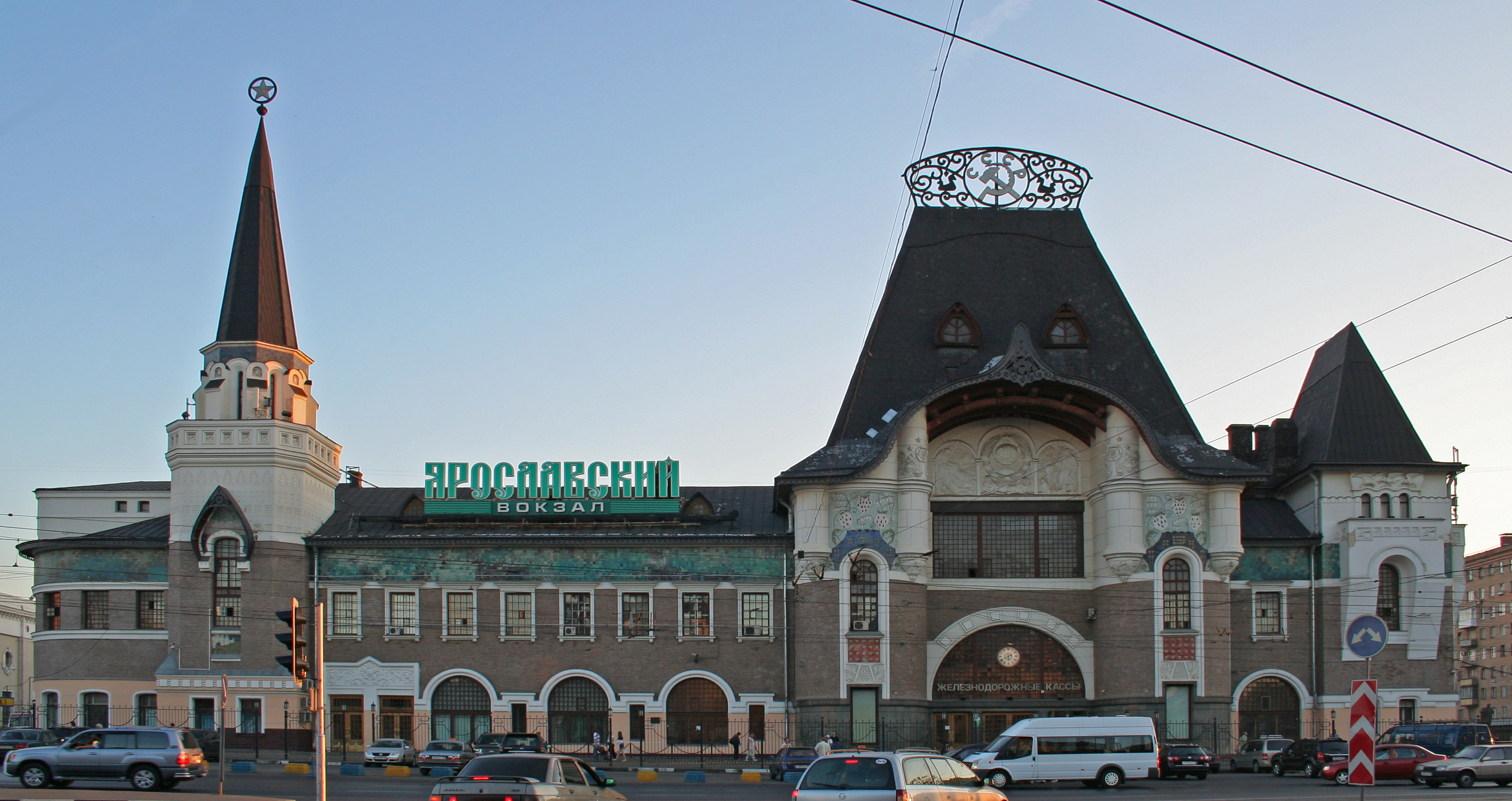
Yaroslavsky railway station by Franz (Fyodor) Schechtel (1902–04)

=== National Romantic style ===
The influence of Nordic National Romantic style was weaker in Moscow than in Saint Petersburg. Buildings with National Romantic influence in Moscow are:

- Lomakina Apartments and Tsirkunov Heirs Apartments by Vitaly Maslennikov,
- Kalinovskaya Apartments by Ernst Richard Nirnsee with ceramics of Alexander Golovin,
- Loskov Apartments by Alexander Zelenko.
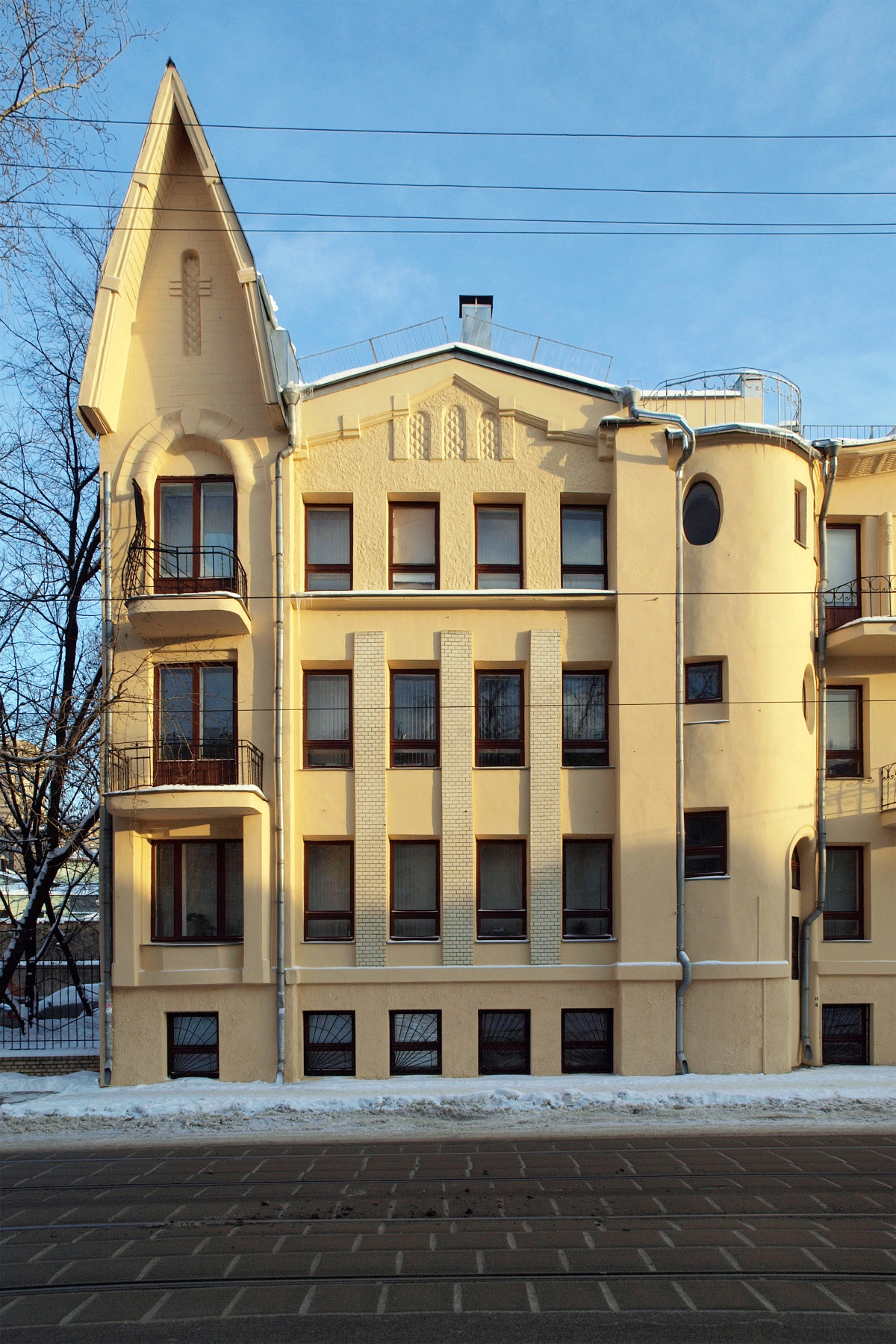
Lomakina Apartments

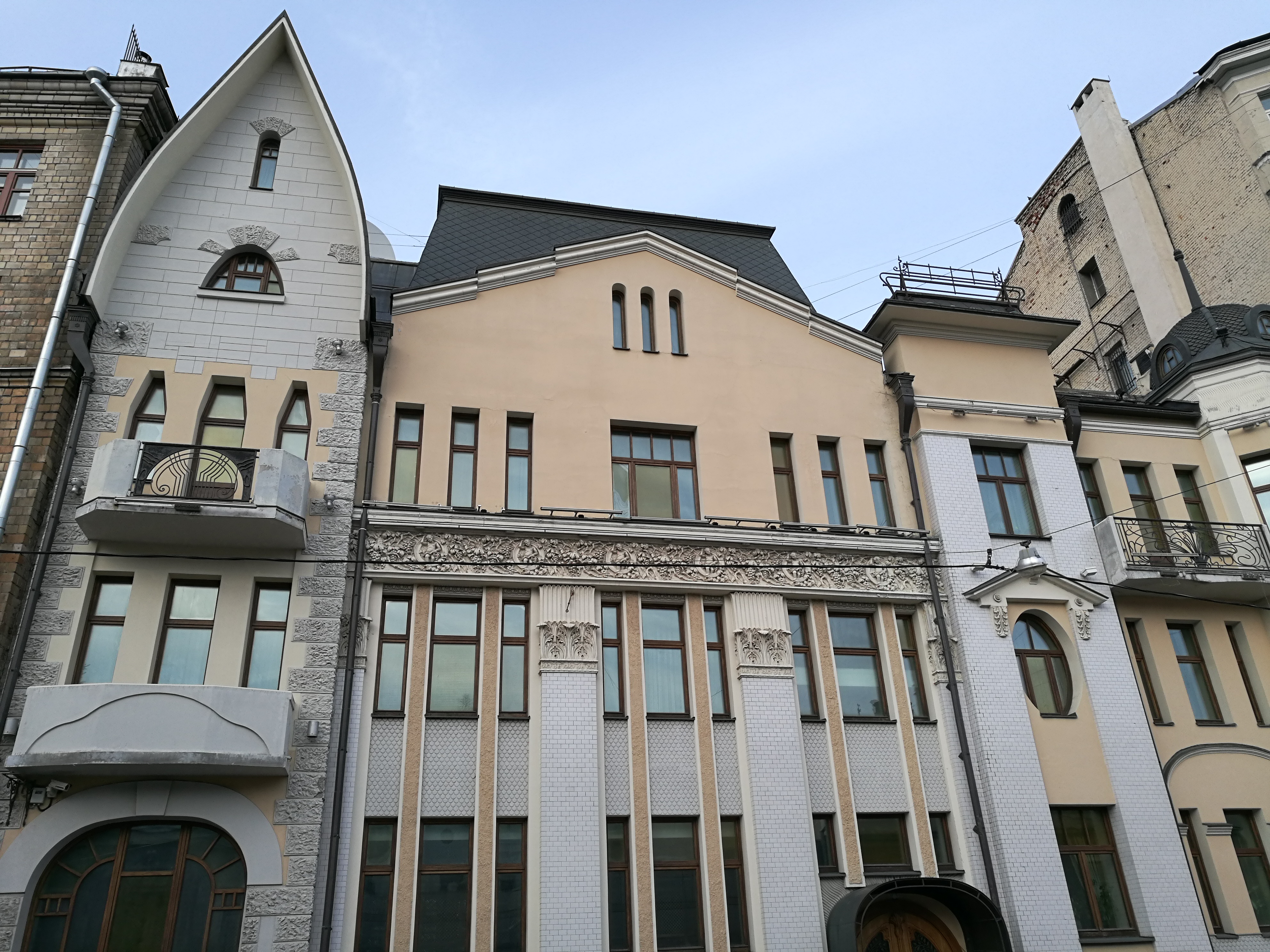
Tsirkunov Heirs Apartments

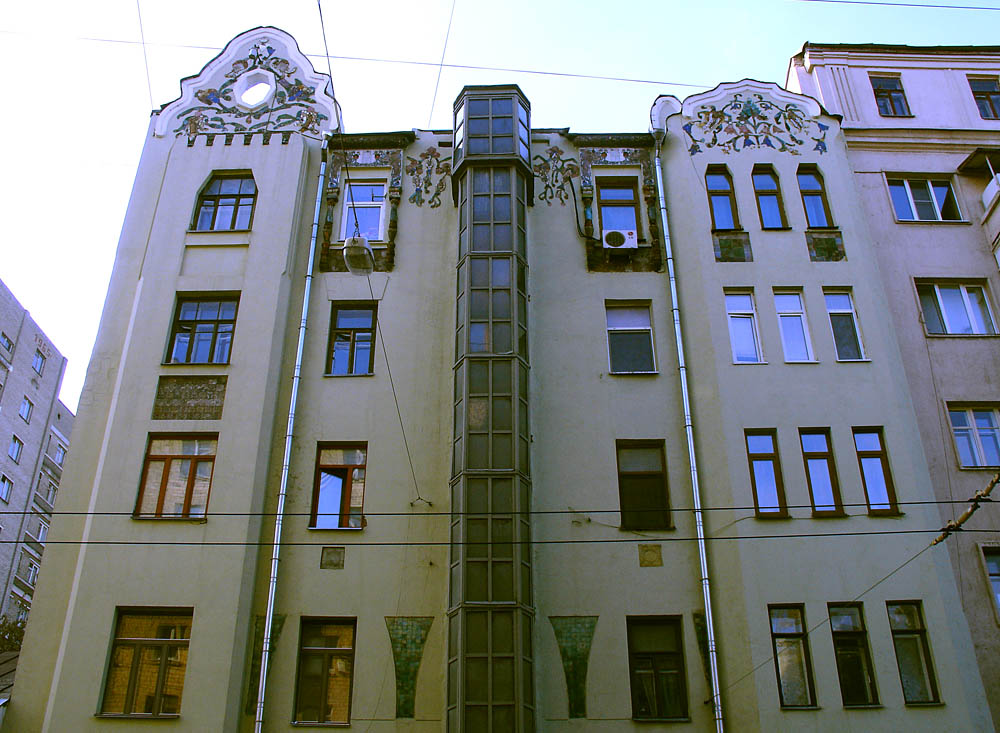
Kalinovskaya Apartments

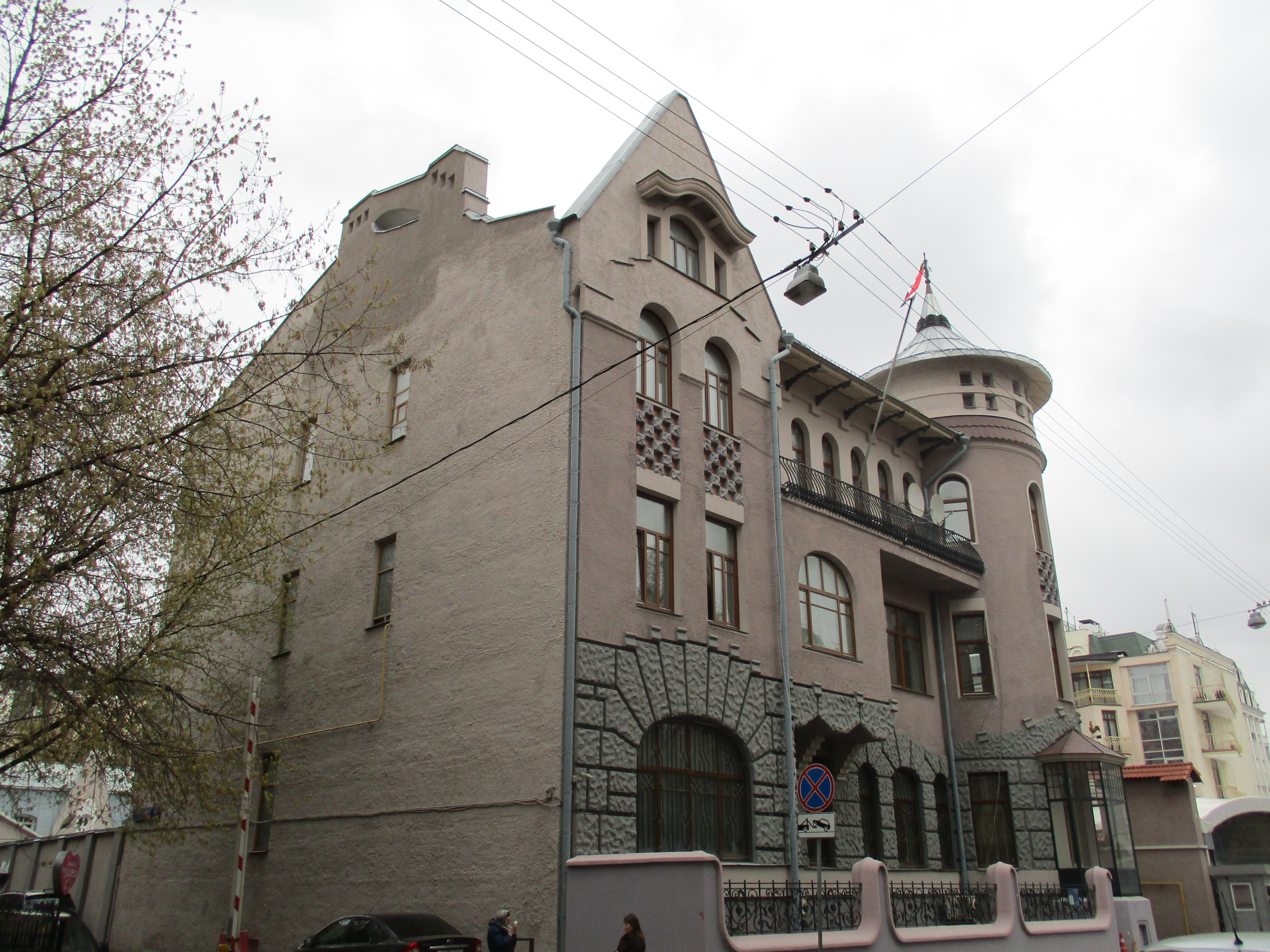
Loskov Apartments

=== Old Believers churches ===
After the restriction to build Old Believers churches was withdrawn in 1905, construction of numerous Old Believers churches was started. Along with two churches listed above, some of them shared both Russian Revival and Art Nouveau characteristics:

- Holy Virgin Protection Church by Vladimir Adamovich and Vladimir Mayat (1907–1911),
- Belfry Church of Resurrection by Fyodor Gornostaev (1910),
- Saint Nicholas Church by Anton Gurzhienko (1914–1921),

An Old Believers chapel was also built on the upper floor of the Ryabushensky House in Moscow, with a mixture of Russian Revival architecture and Art Nouveau decoration.

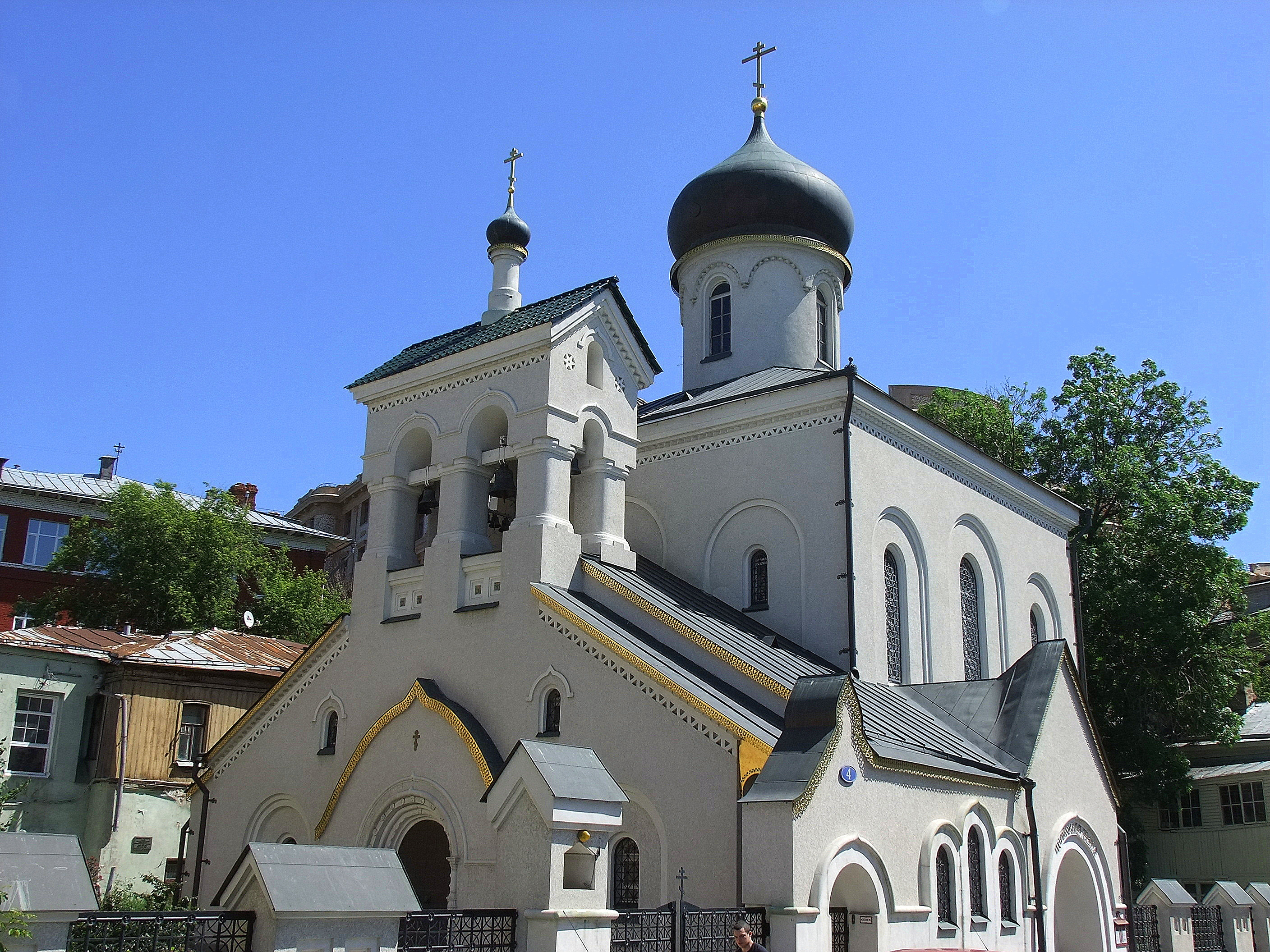
Holy Virgin Protection Church

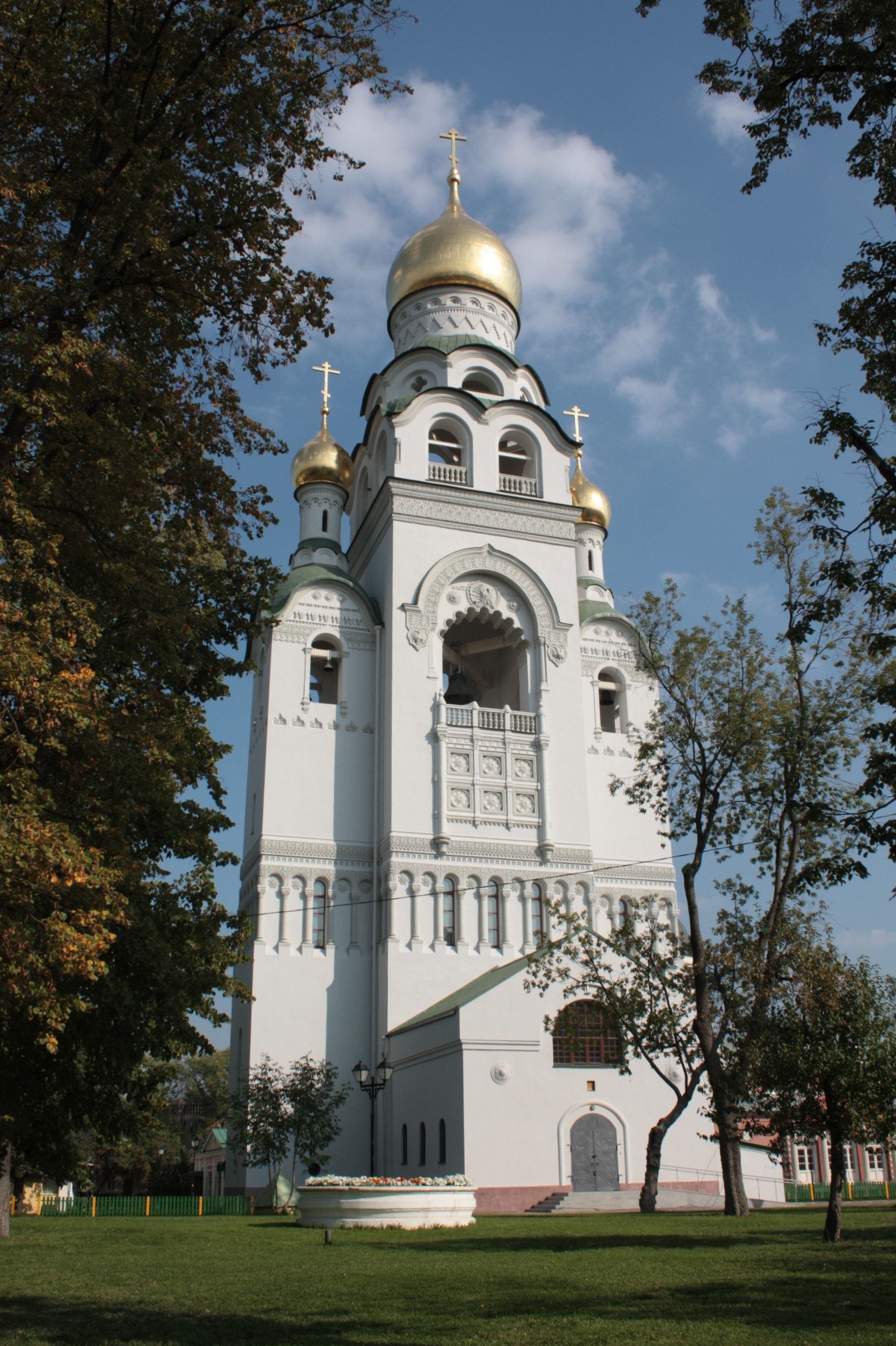
Belfry Church of Resurrection

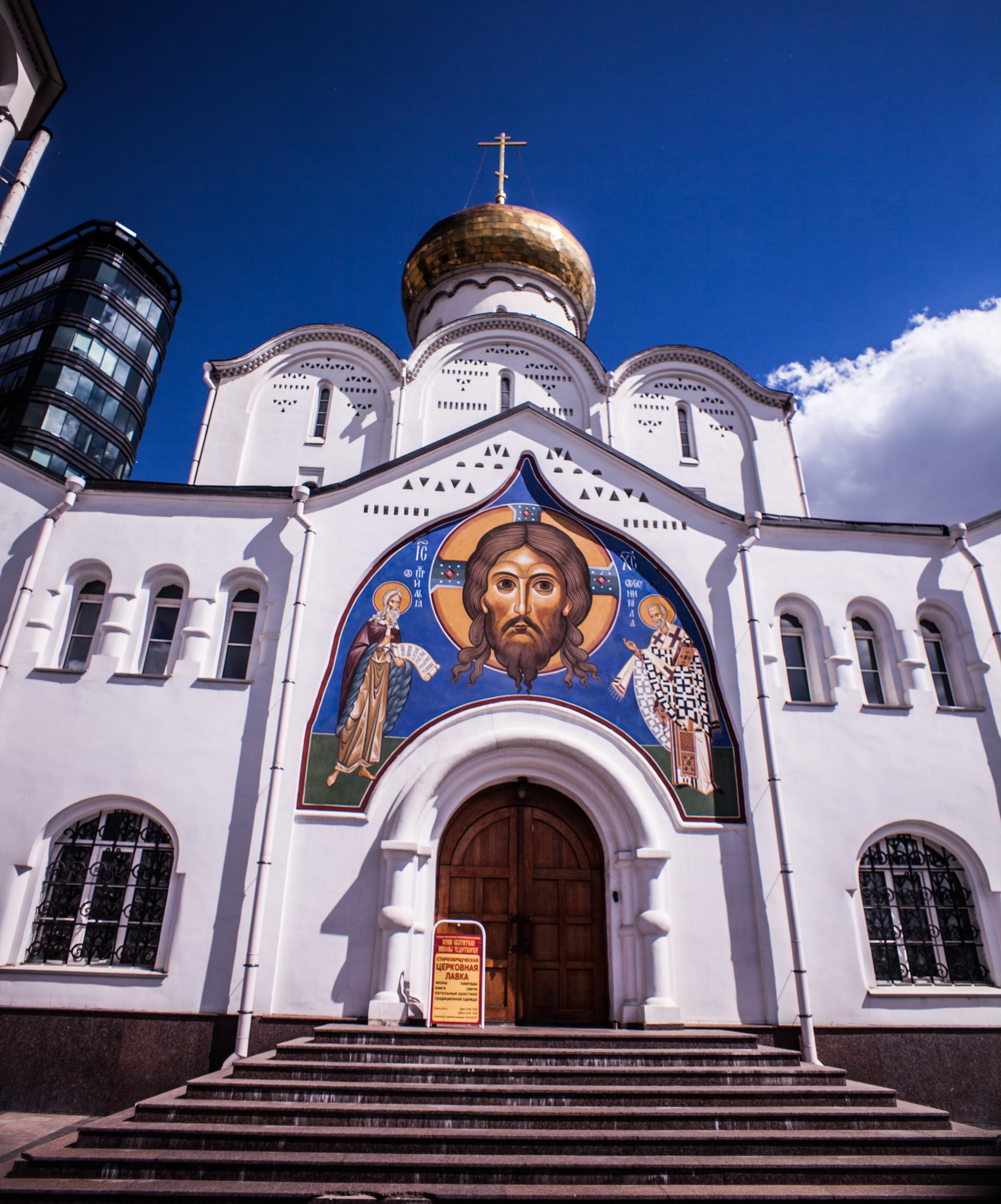
Saint Nicholas Church

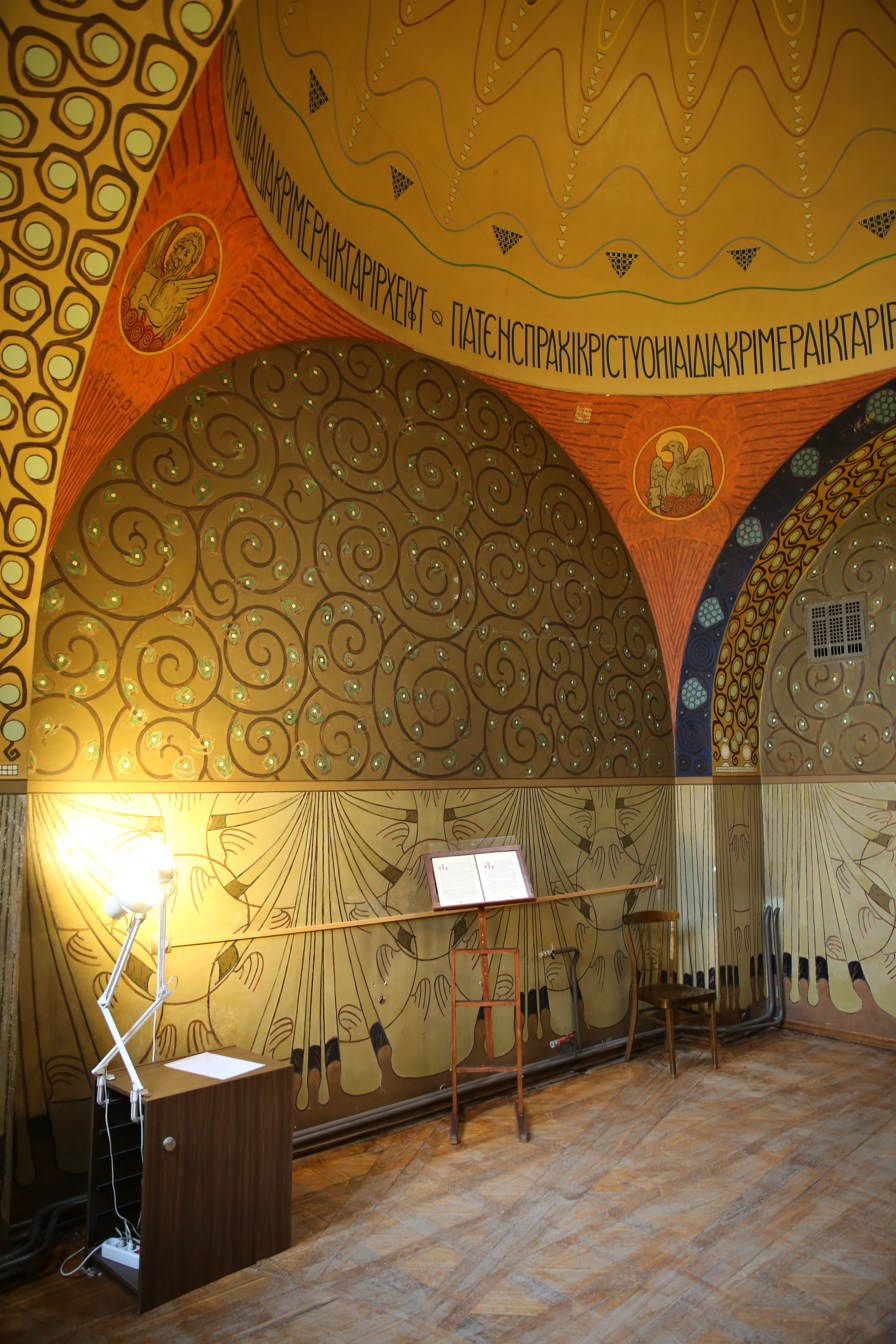
Interior of the chapel in the Ryabushinsky House

=== Other architects ===
Other notable architects of Art Nouveau in Moscow include:

- Illarion Ivanov-Schitz, who developed a unique personal style, blending the Vienna Secession school with Greek Revival features,
- Ilya Bondarenko, who was the architect of two Old Believers churches,
- Alexey Shchusev, who is mostly known for his works during USSR time and notably design of Lenin's Mausoleum, was an architect of the katholikon of Marfo-Mariinsky Convent (also known as Martha and Mary Convent, 1908–1912). The commissioner of the complex, Grand Duchess Elizabeth Feodorovna was born near Darmstadt that was the center of Jugendstil at the time,
- Sergey Malyutin, an artist of Mir iskusstva movement, who after leaving Talashkino colony stood behind Pertsova House (also known as Pertsov House, 1905–1907)

The Trinity Church Apartments building (also known as House with Beasts) includes a stone carving made by Sergei Vashkov inspired by carvings of Cathedral of Saint Demetrius in Vladimir and Saint George Cathedral in Yuryev-Polsky of XII and XIII centuries.

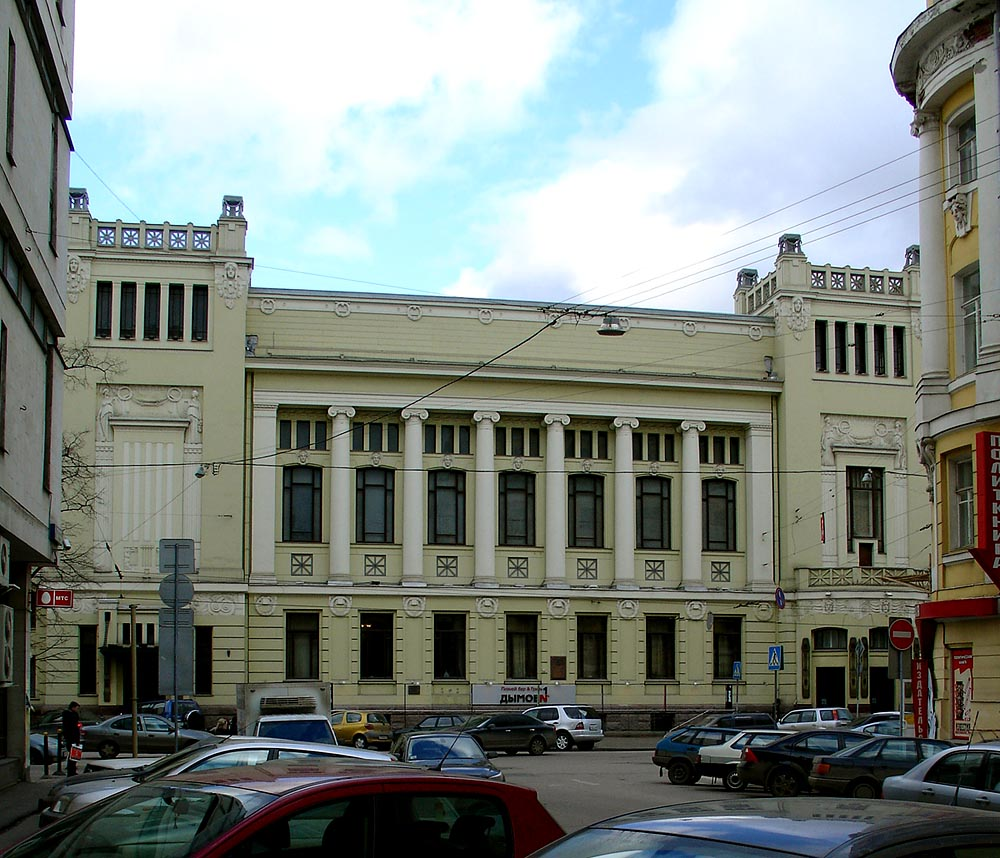
Lenkom Theatre by Illarion Ivanov-Schitz

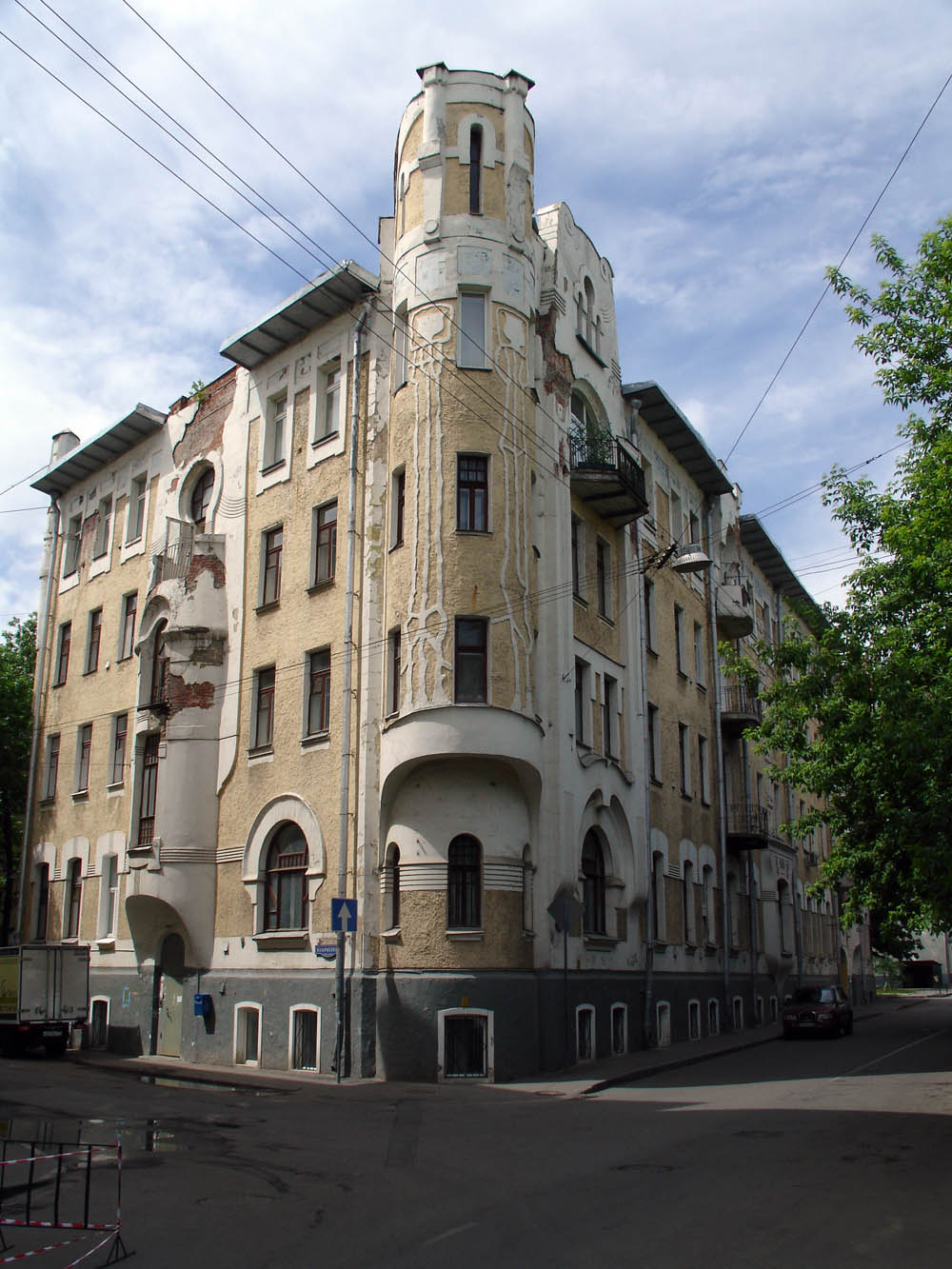
Tarkhova Apartments by Georgy Makayev

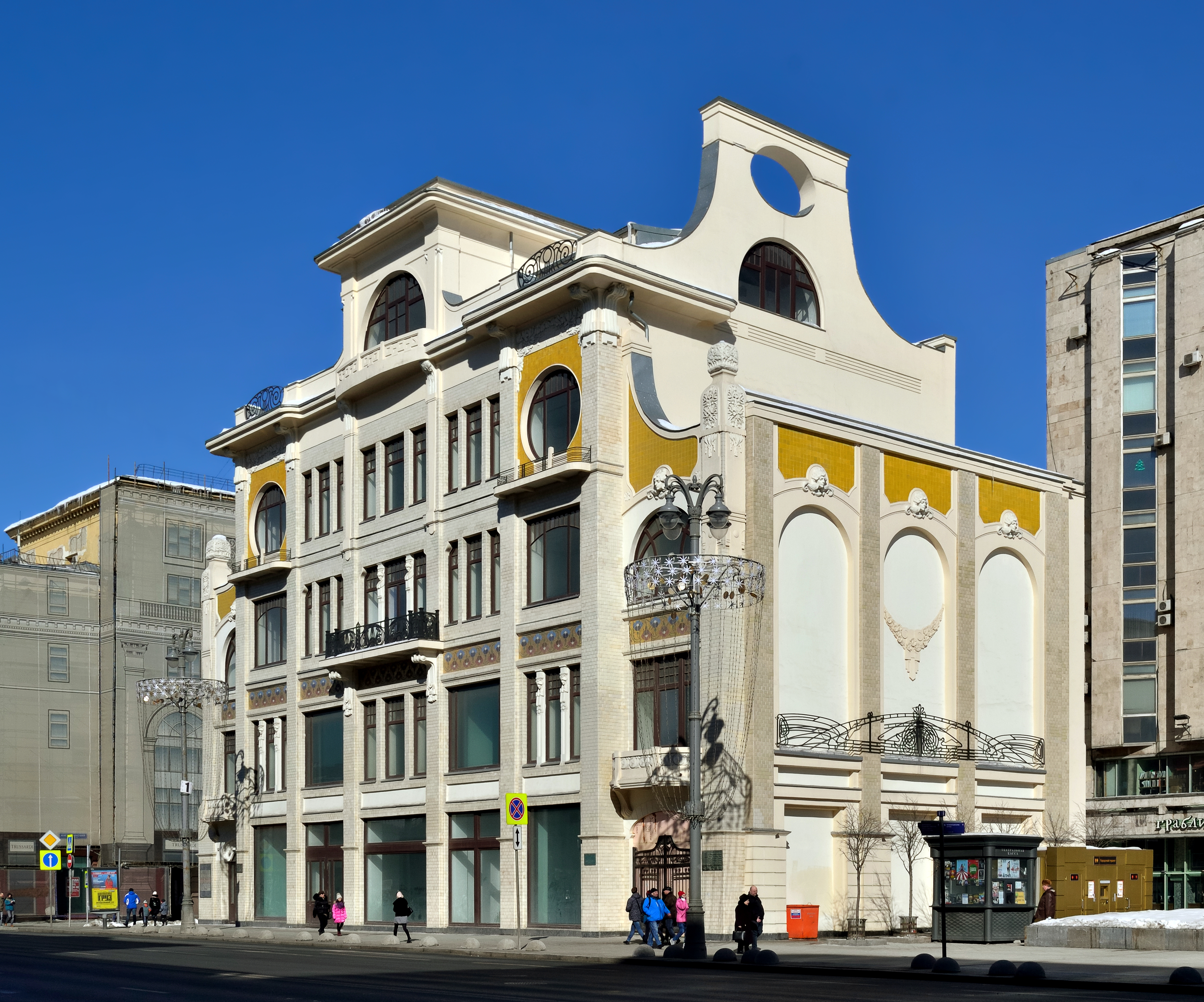
Sytin Publishers building

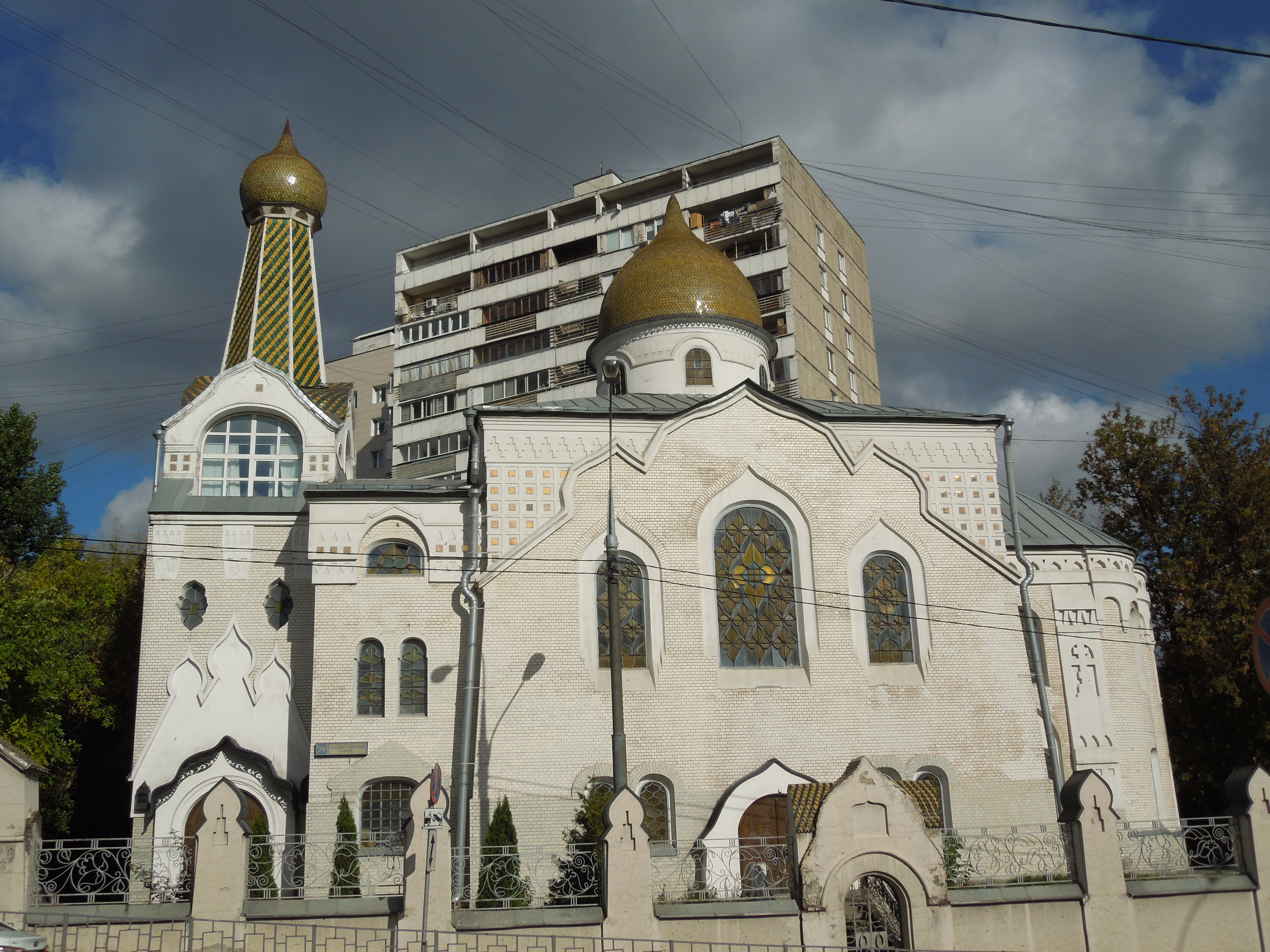
Old Believers church in Maly Gavrikov lane

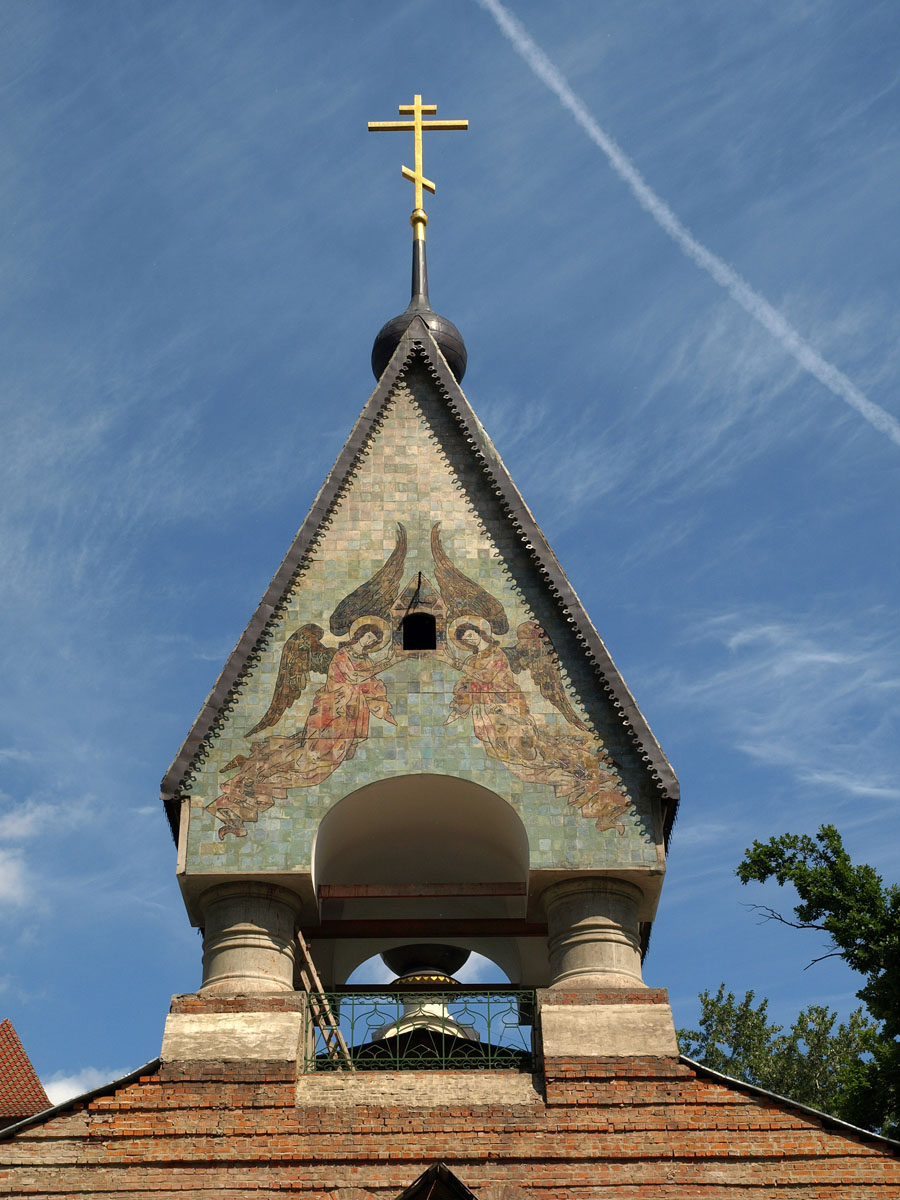
Old Believers church in Tokmakov lane

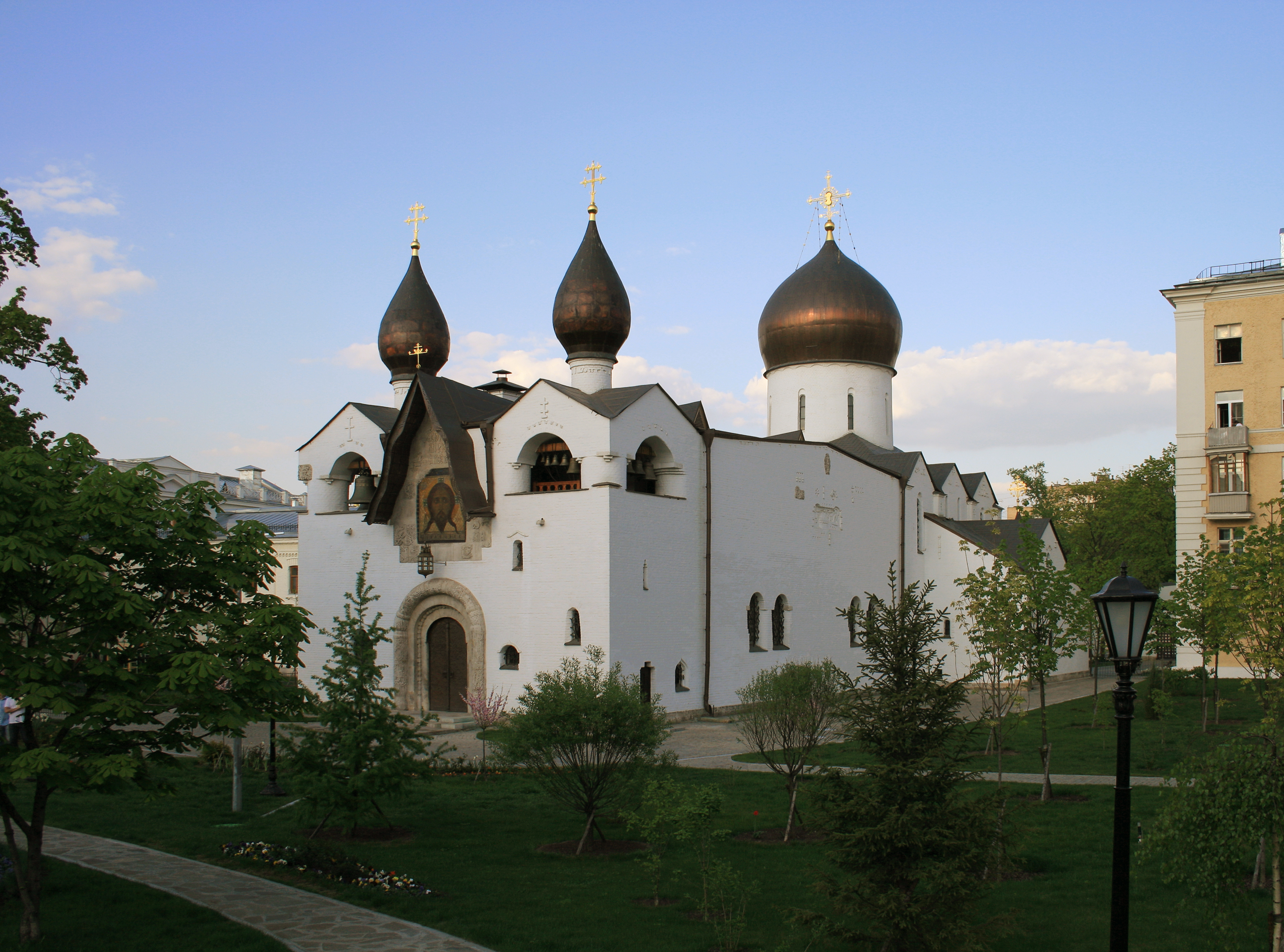
Marfo-Mariinsky Convent by Alexey Shchusev

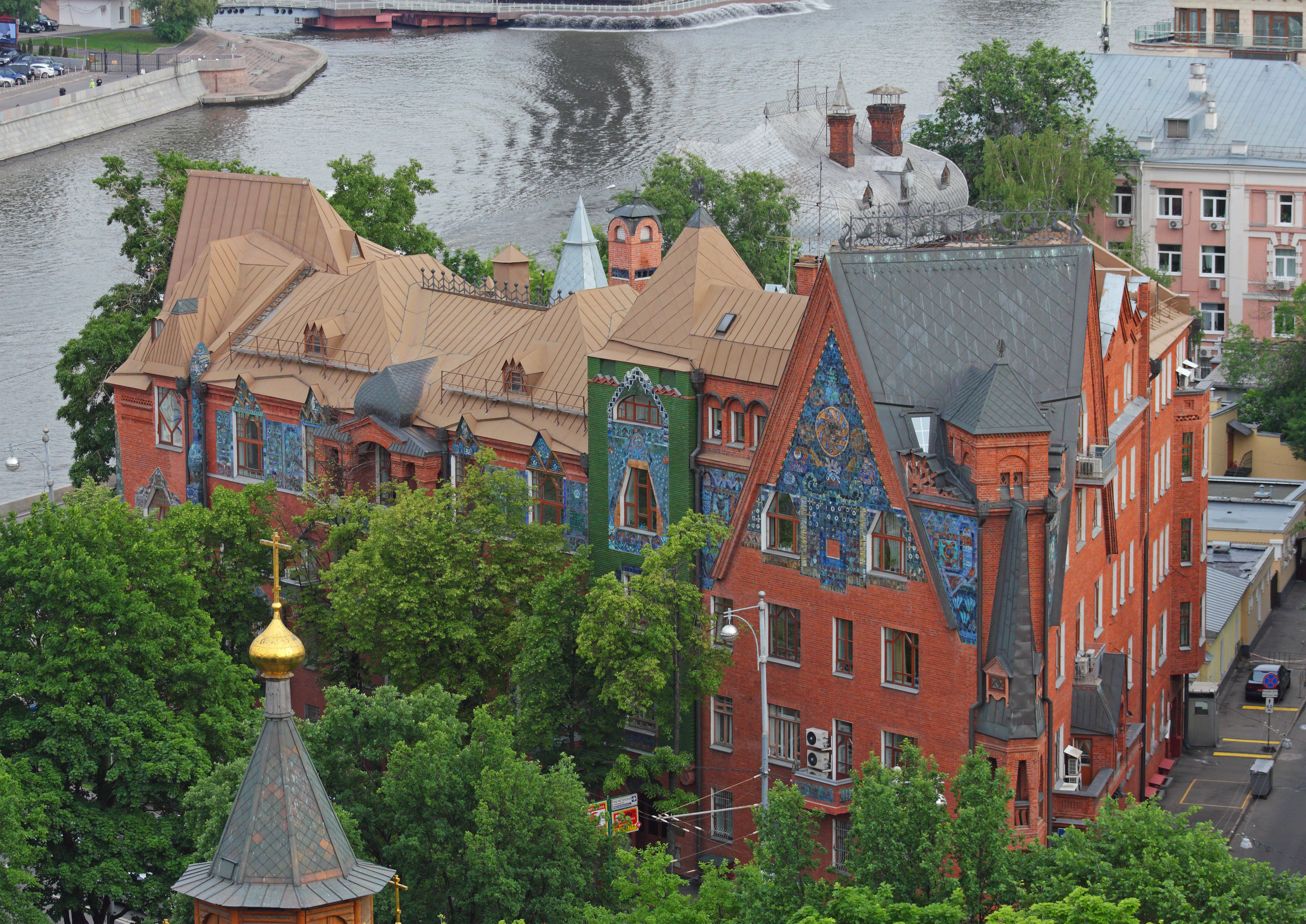
Pertsova House

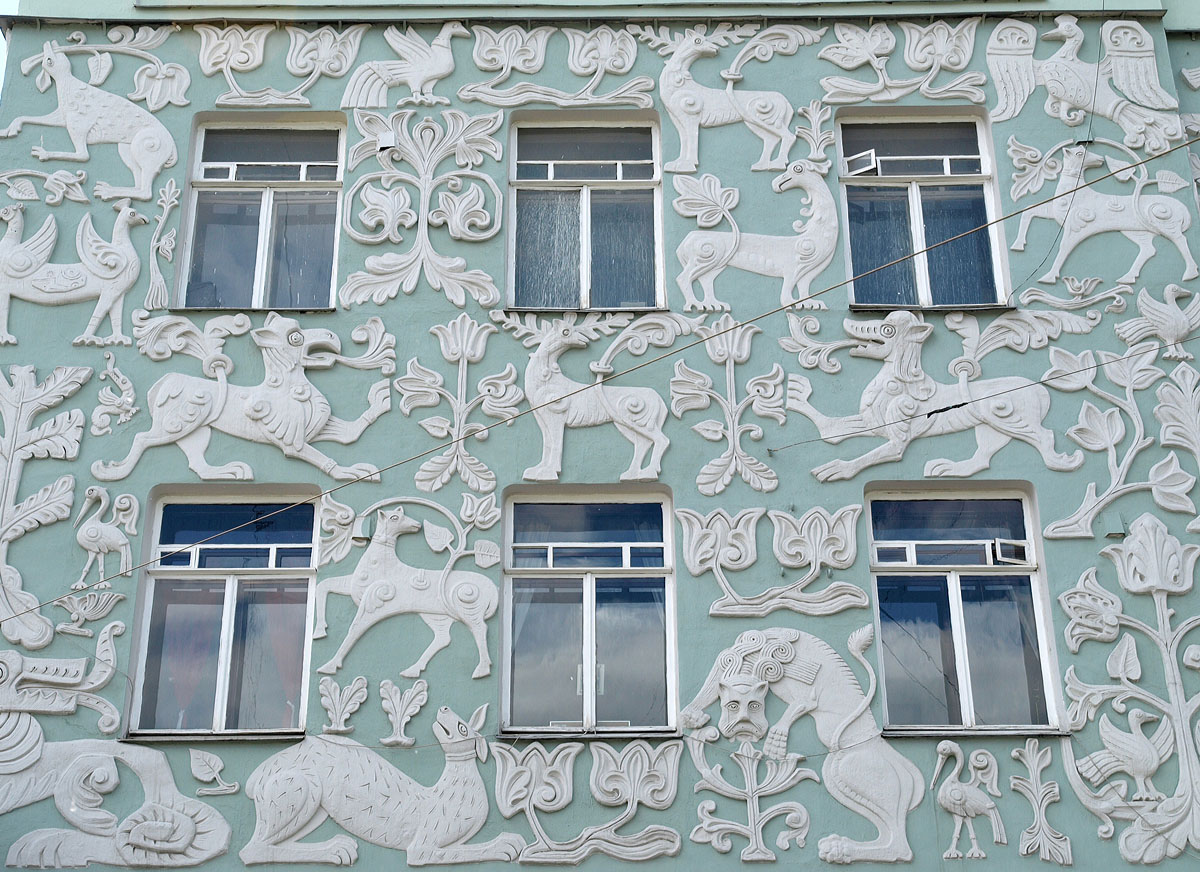
Bas-reliefs at facade of Trinity Church Apartments

== Art Nouveau and Russian Revival style outside Saint Petersburg and Moscow ==
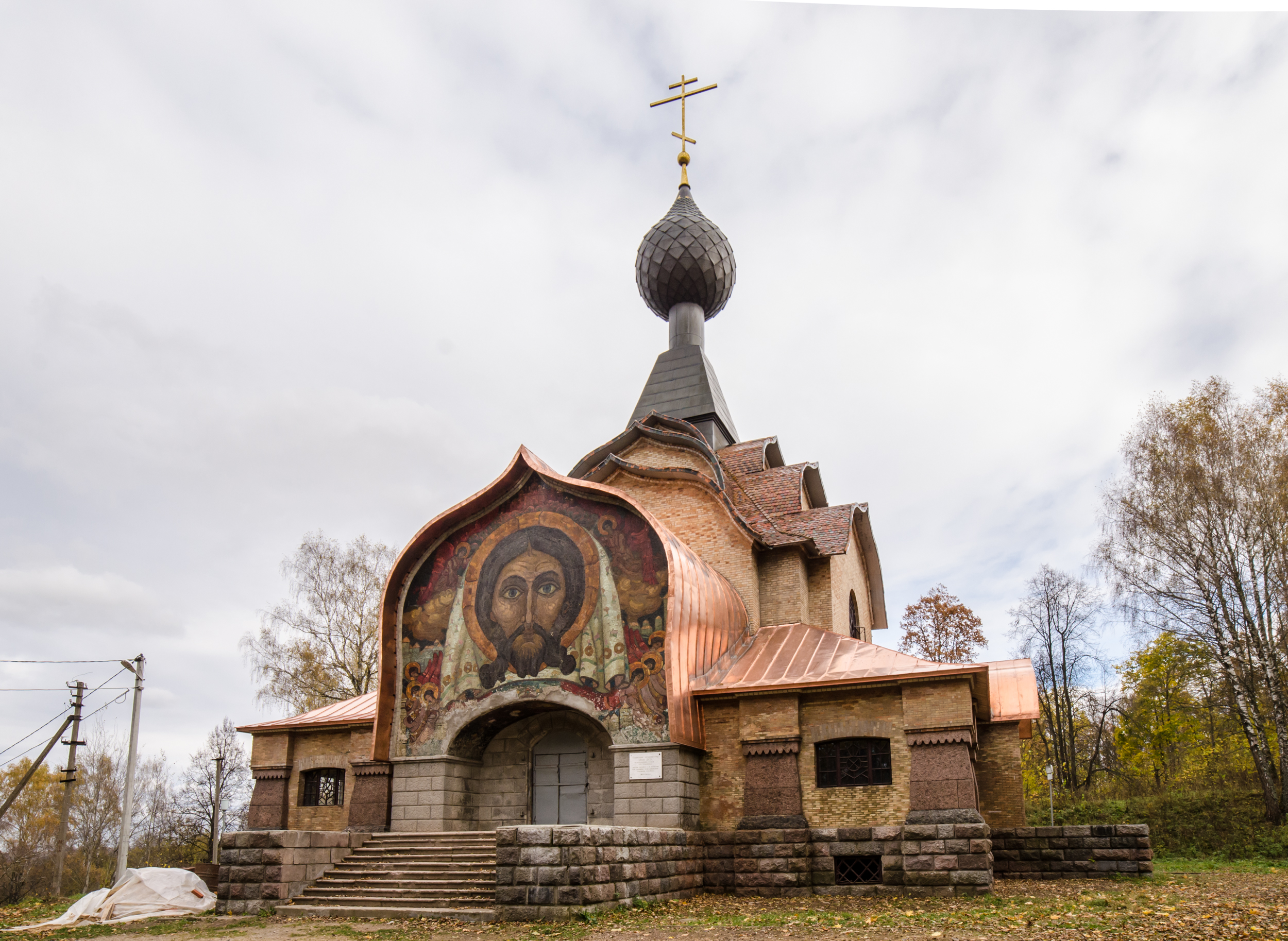
The Church of the Holy Spirit in Talashkino by Sergey Malyutin, 1903–05.

=== Art colonies ===
Art Nouveau in Russia was promoted not only by single architects but also by art colonies who worked in the Russian Revival style. The two best-known colonies were situated in Abramtsevo, funded by Savva Mamontov, and Talashkino, funded by Princess Maria Tenisheva. They mostly dealt with interior and ceramics but also left architecture monuments:

- The Church of the Holy Spirit in Talashkino by Sergey Malyutin with mosaics of Nicholas Roerich (1903–1905),
- Teremok House in Talashkino by Sergey Malyutin (1901–1902) who later developed a project of Pertsova House in Moscow (see above).

Some researches include Church of the Holy Mandylion in Abramtsevo in the list of Art Nouveau buildings, but it was built in 1881–1891, before the inception of Art Nouveau movement.

=== Other Orthodox churches ===
Most Art Nouveau churches in Russia are also considered Russian Revival. Along with the already described examples, some notable exampled include:

- Church of the Holy Trinity in Balakovo, Saratov Oblast by Fyodor Schechtel (1908–09),
- Church of the Holy Trinity in Bekhovo, Tula Oblast by famous artist Vasily Polenov who acted as the architect for the church in his own estate (1904–1906),
- Seraphimo-Znamenskiy Skit in Bityagovo, Moscow Oblast by Leonid Stezhensky (1912),
- Resurrection cathedral in Tver by Nikolay Omelyusty (1912–1913),
- Church of the Holy Mandylion in Klyazma, Pushkino, Moscow Oblast by Sergei Vashkov and Vasily Motylyov (1913–1916).
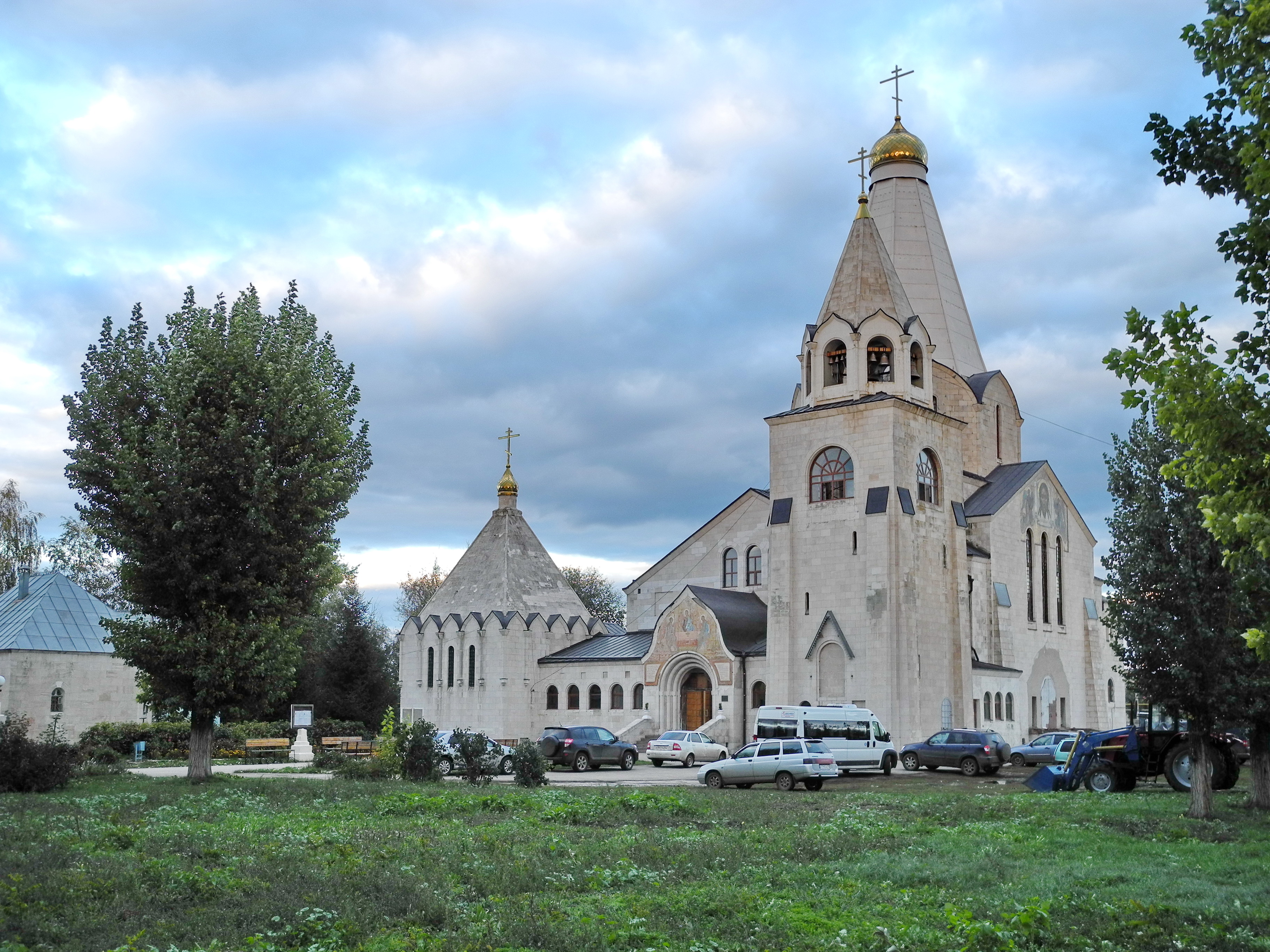
Balakovo

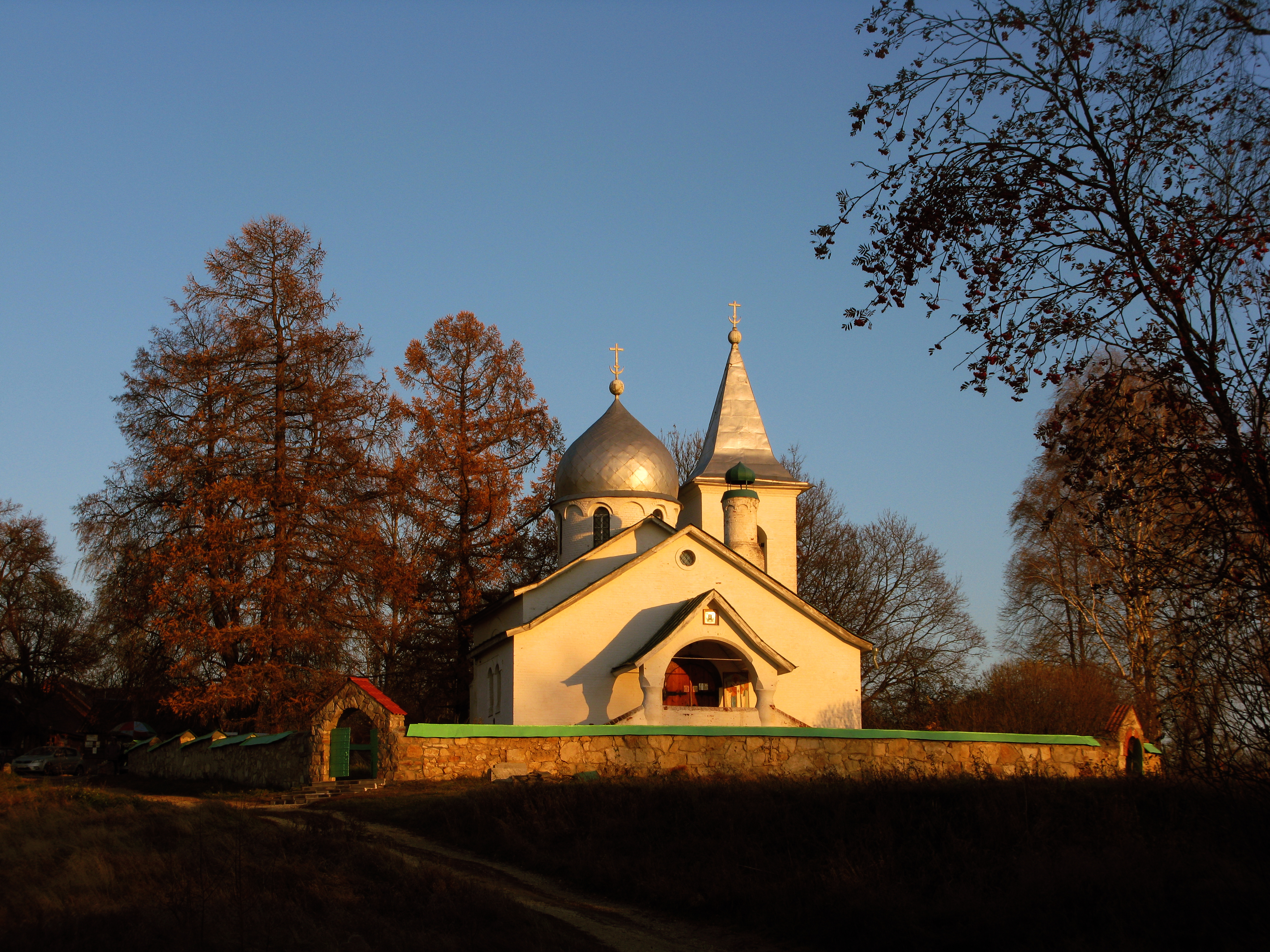
Bekhovo

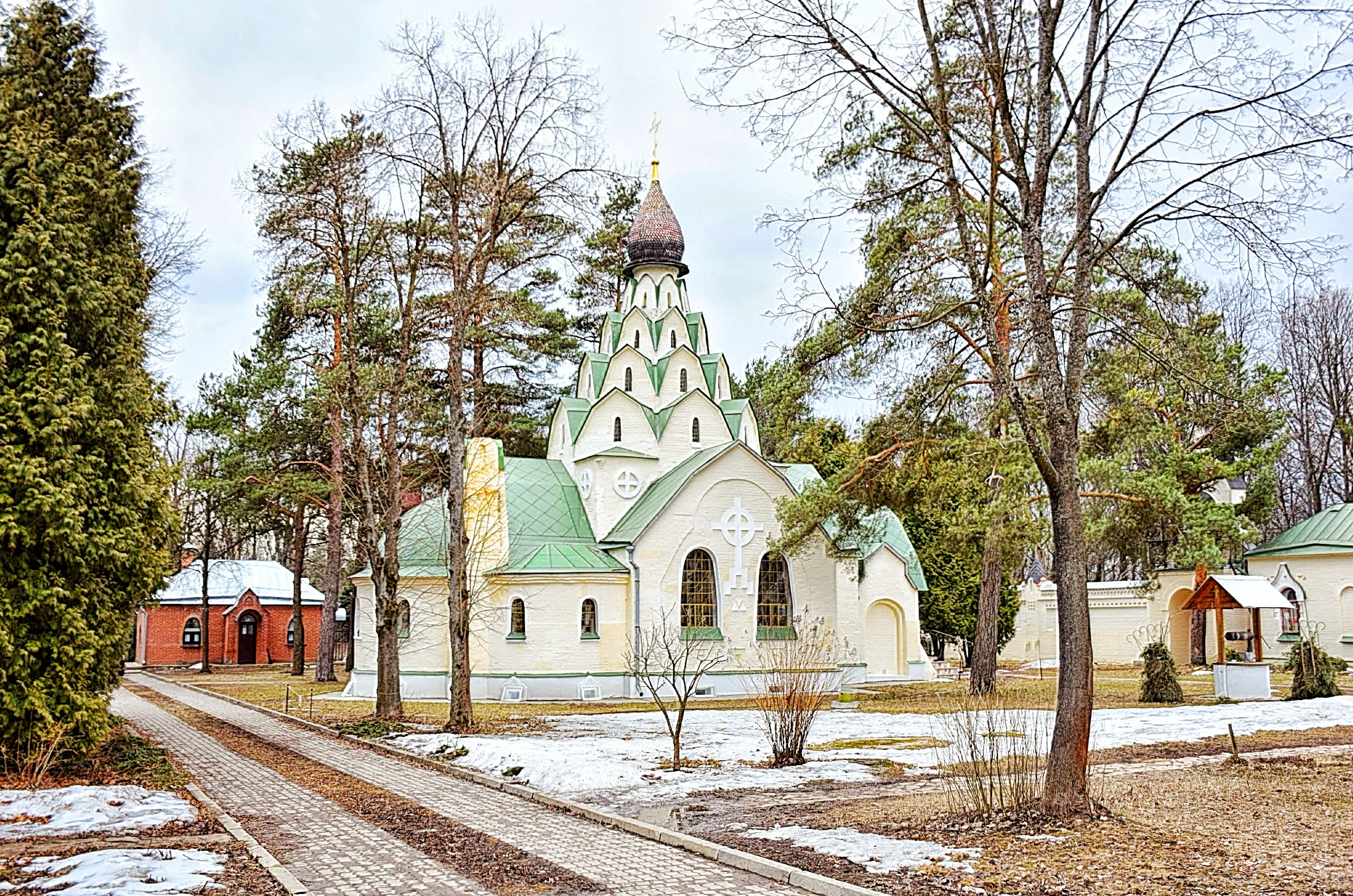
Bityagovo

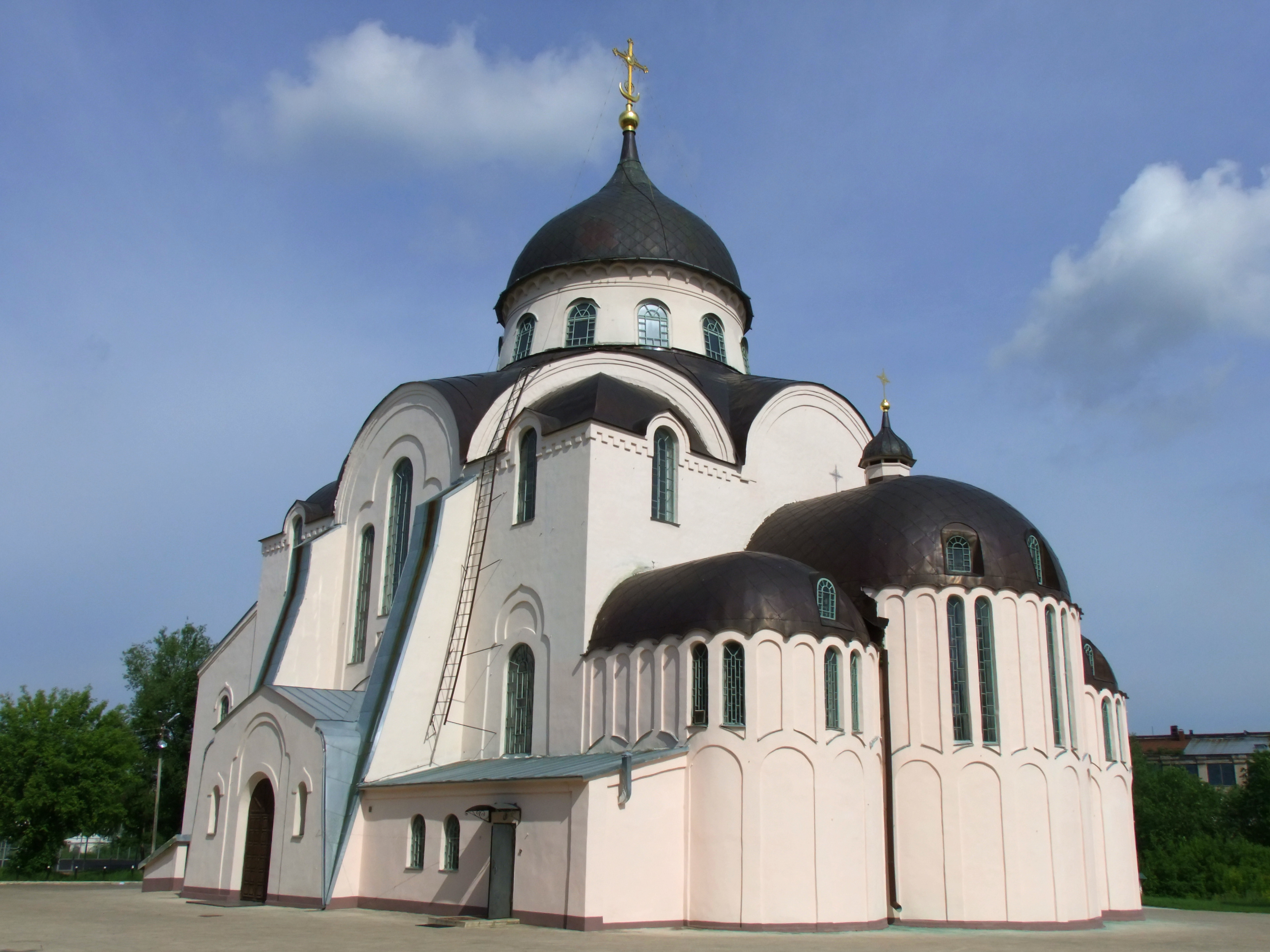
Tver

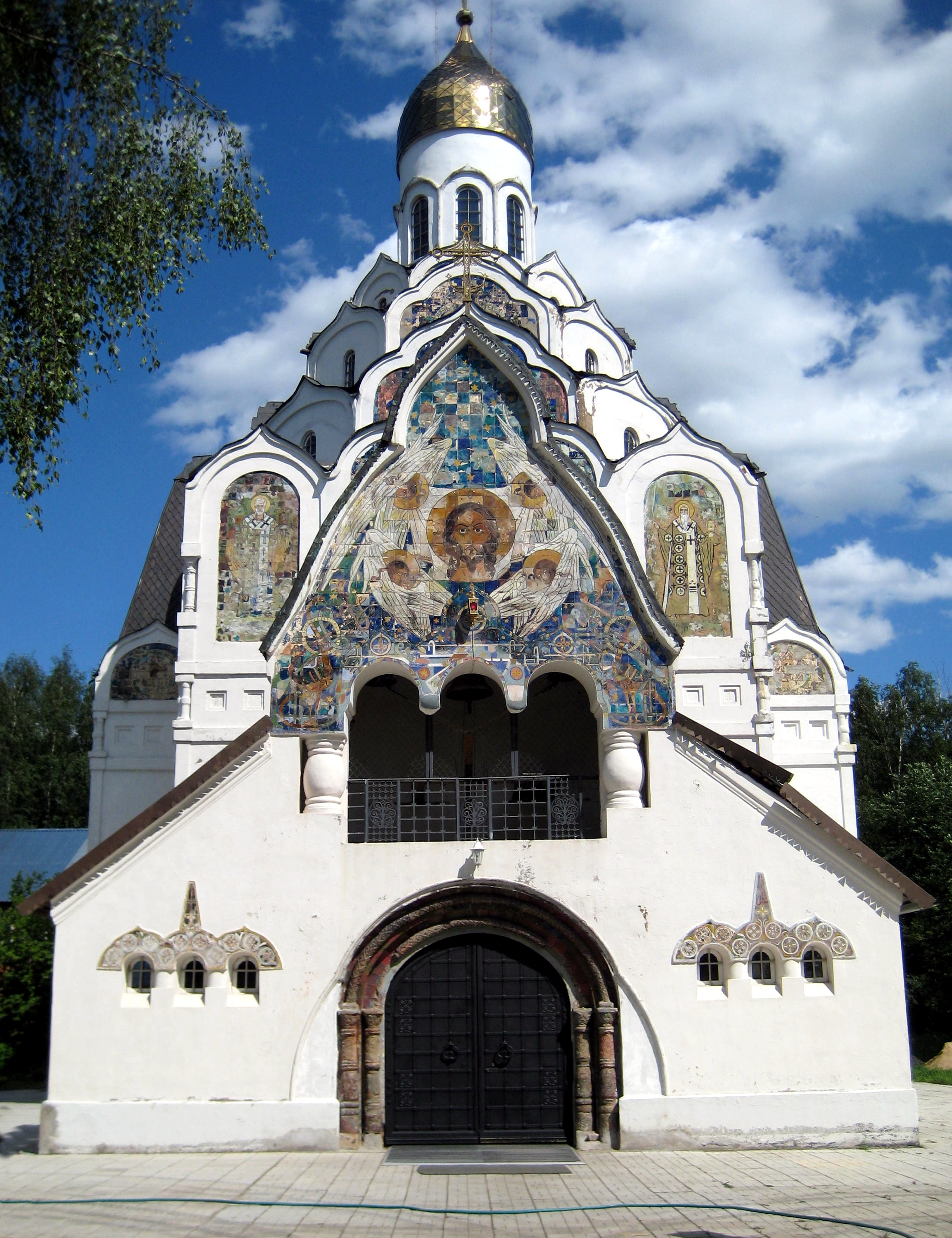
Klyazma

=== Wooden art ===
Wood carving is also a distinctive feature of the Russian Revival style and has become a feature of Russian Art Nouveau wooden houses. Houses with wood carvings can be found not only in Central Russia but also in Ural (Kungur and Kurgan) and Siberia (Tomsk and Tyumen).

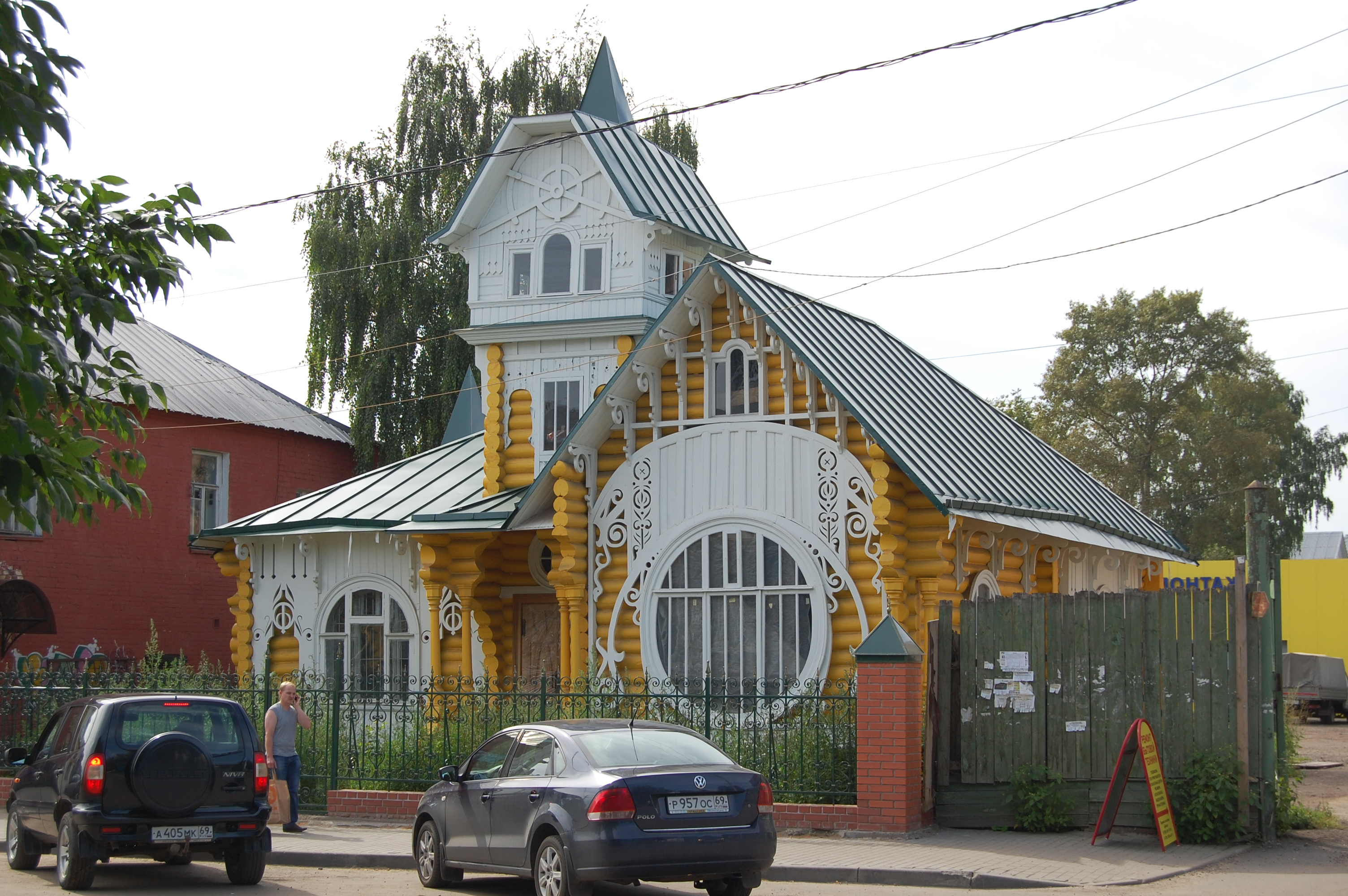
Kimry, Tver Oblast

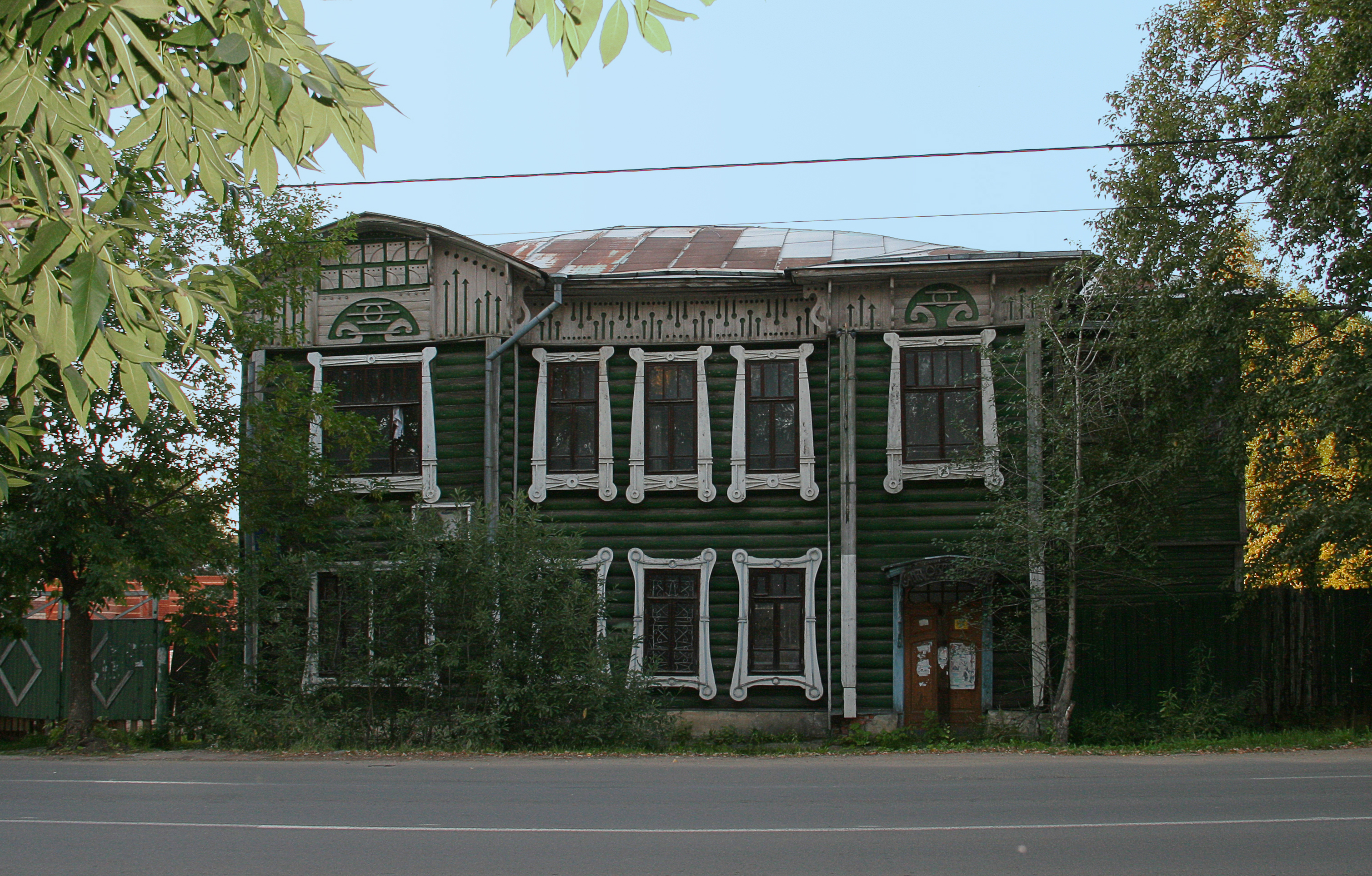
Rostov, Yaroslavl Oblast

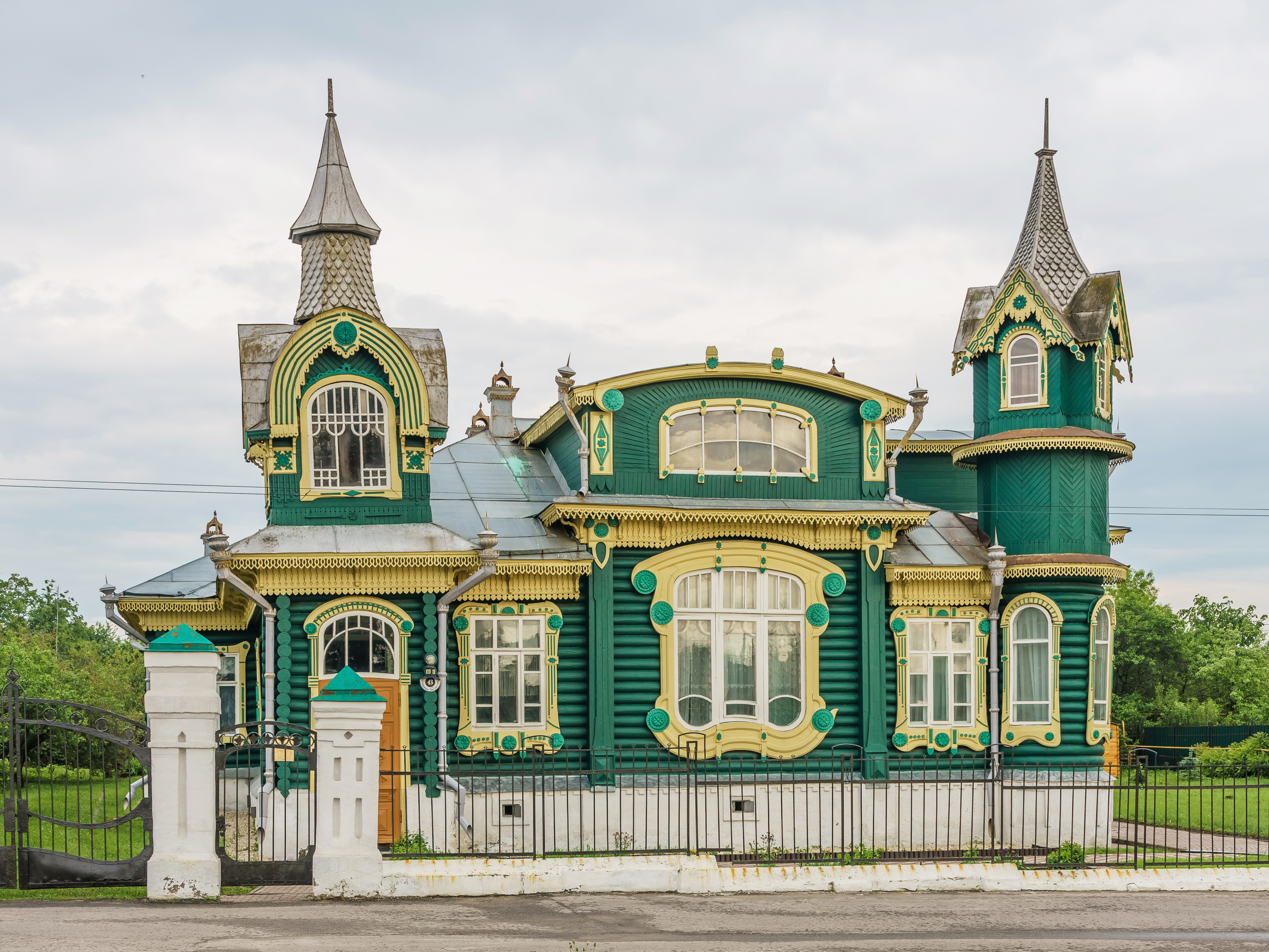
Gorokhovets, Vladimir Oblast

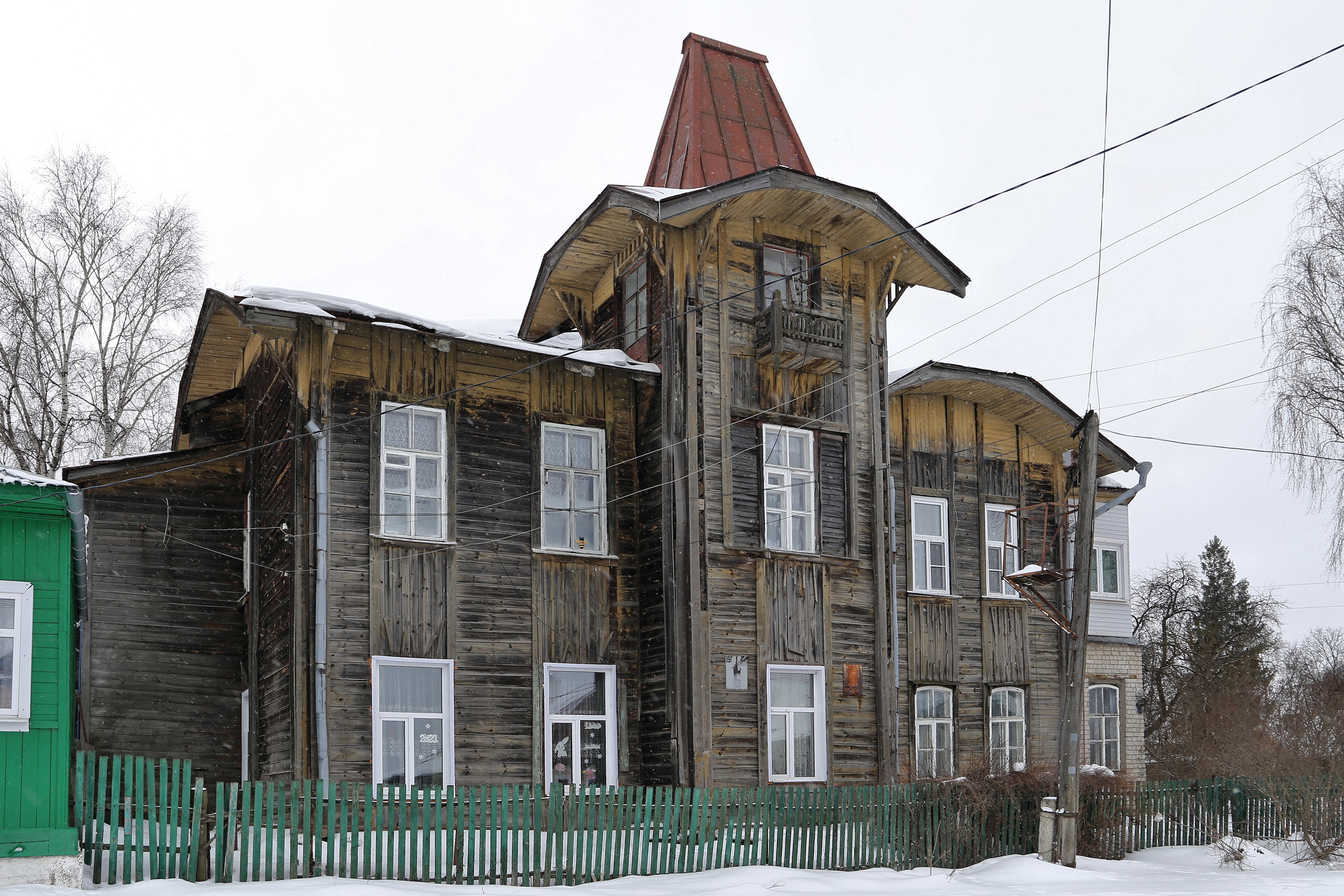
Vyazniki, Vladimir Oblast

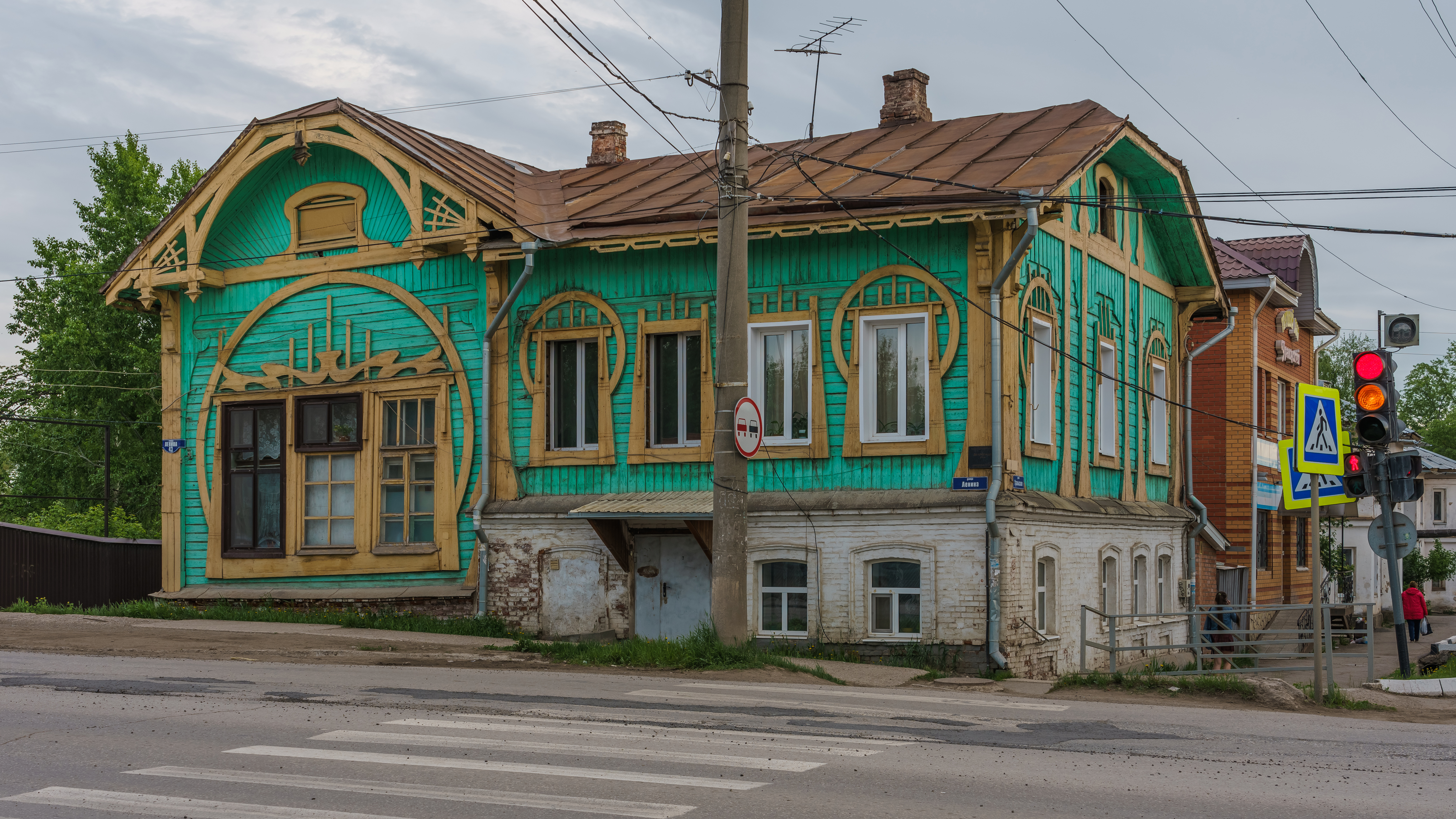
Kungur, Perm Krai

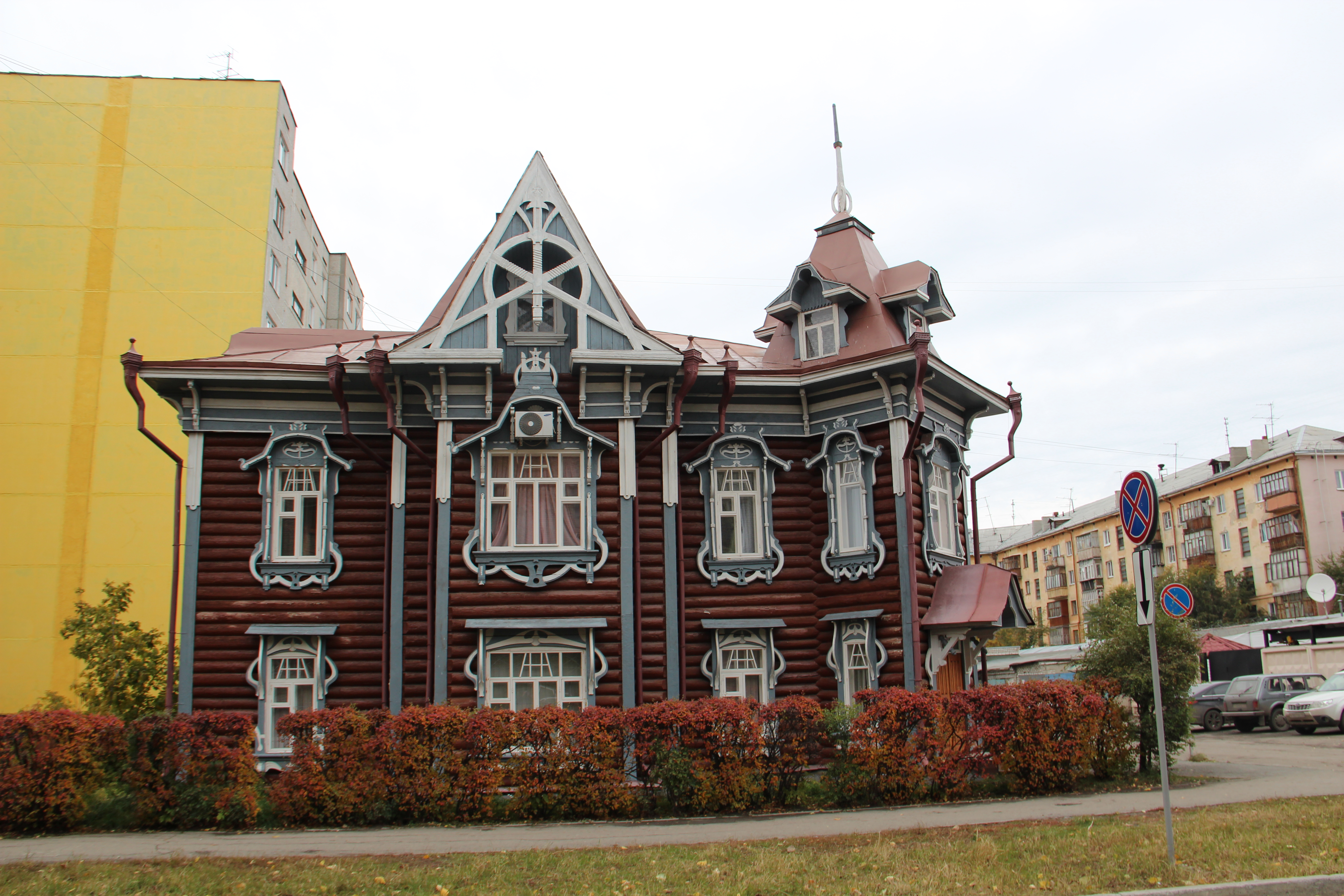
Kurgan

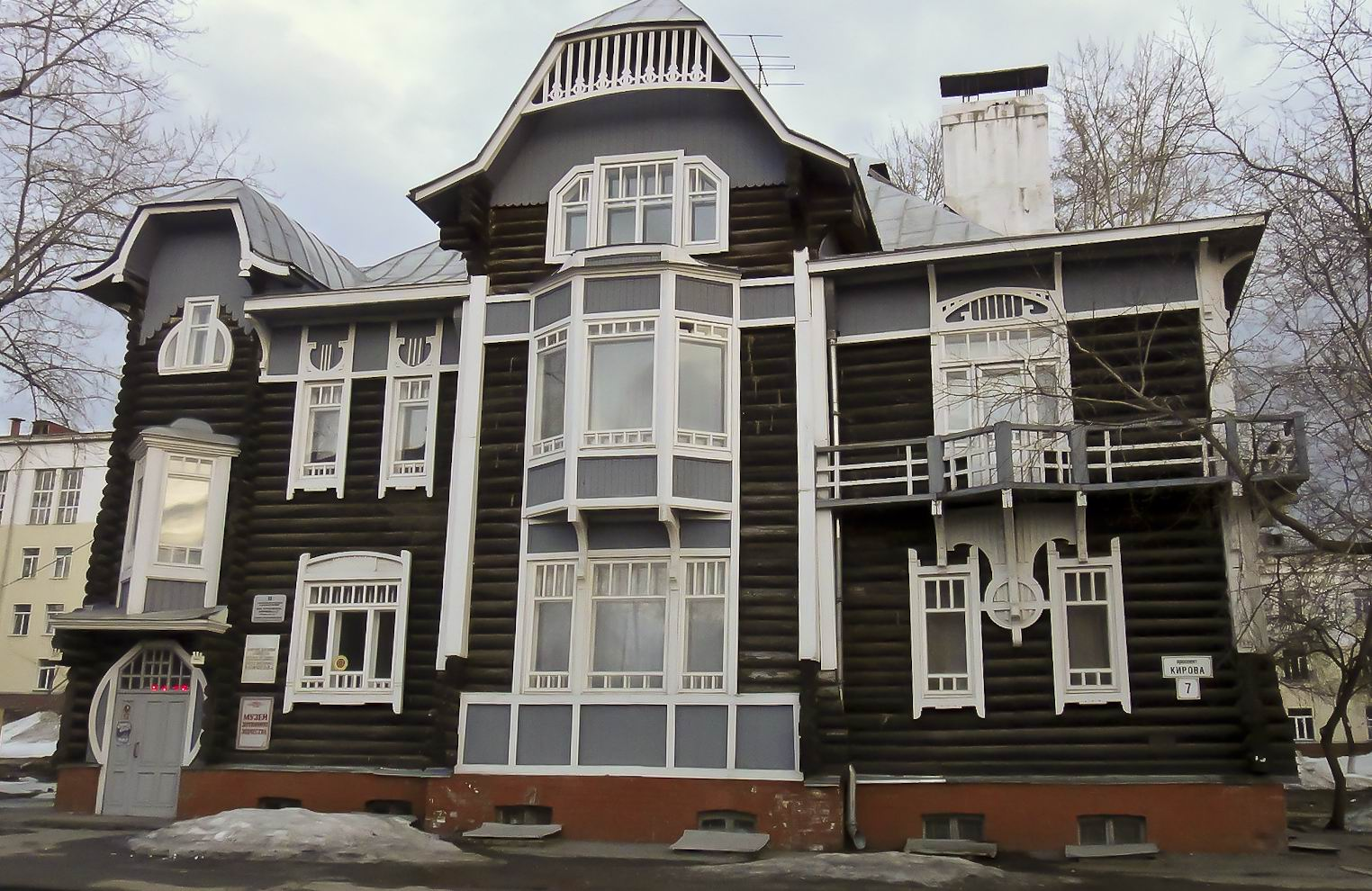
Tomsk

Tyumen

== National Romantic and Jugendstil buildings in Karelia and East Prussia ==
The territories of Karelian Isthmus and partly East Prussia that belonged to Finland and Germany respectively were ceded to Soviet Union after World War II. The Art Nouveau heritage at Karelian Isthmus consisted of:

- secular buildings of Vyborg and Sortavala, one of which was built by famous Finnish architects Herman Gesellius, Armas Lindgren and Eliel Saarinen in 1905,
- three Lutheran churches by Josef Stenbäck in Primorsk, Melnikovo and Zelenogorsk (that has been included into Saint Petersburg city limits).

In East Prussia (that became Kaliningrad Oblast) houses in Zelenogradsk and the water tower in Svetlogorsk can be noted.

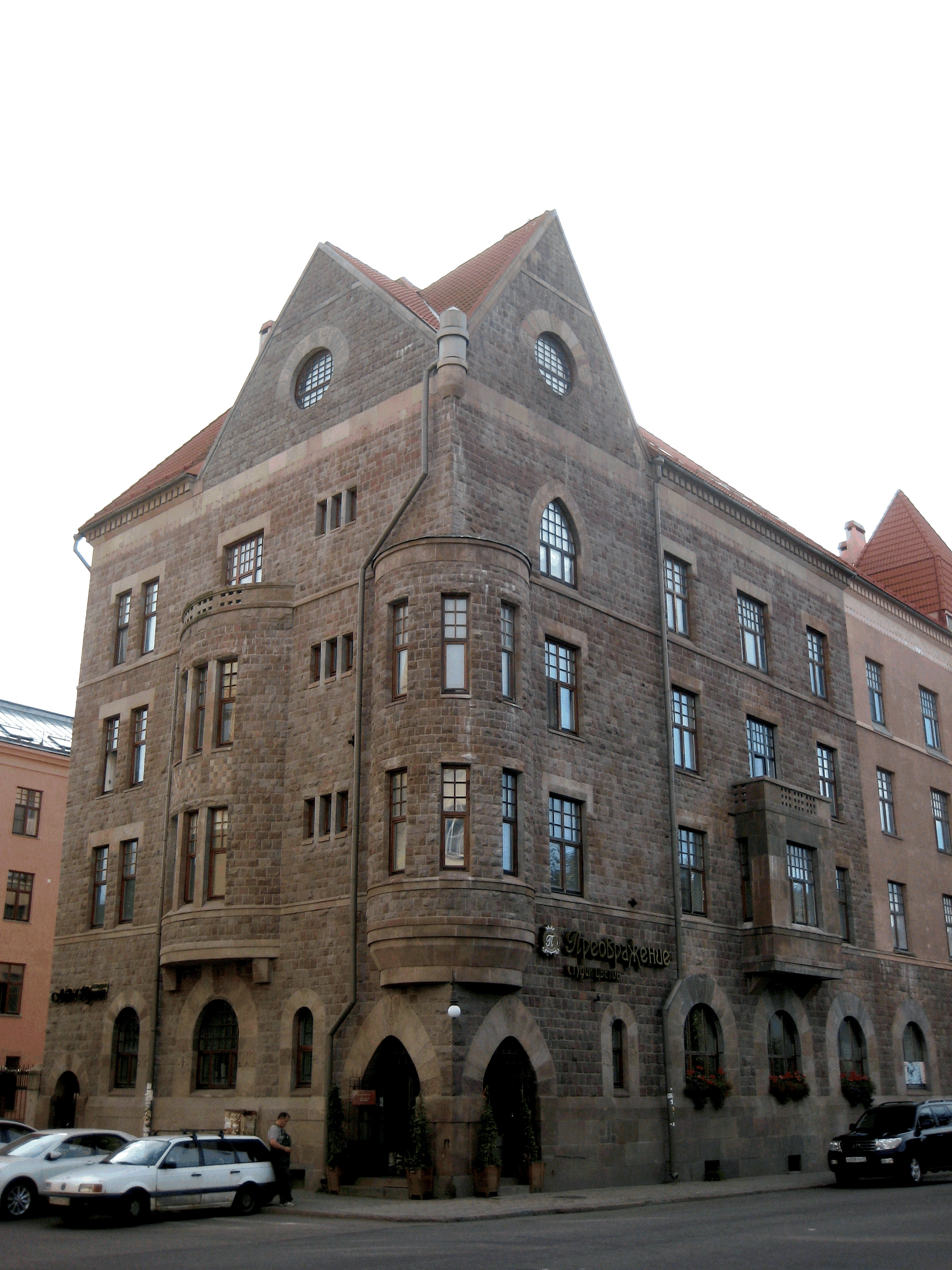
House in Vyborg

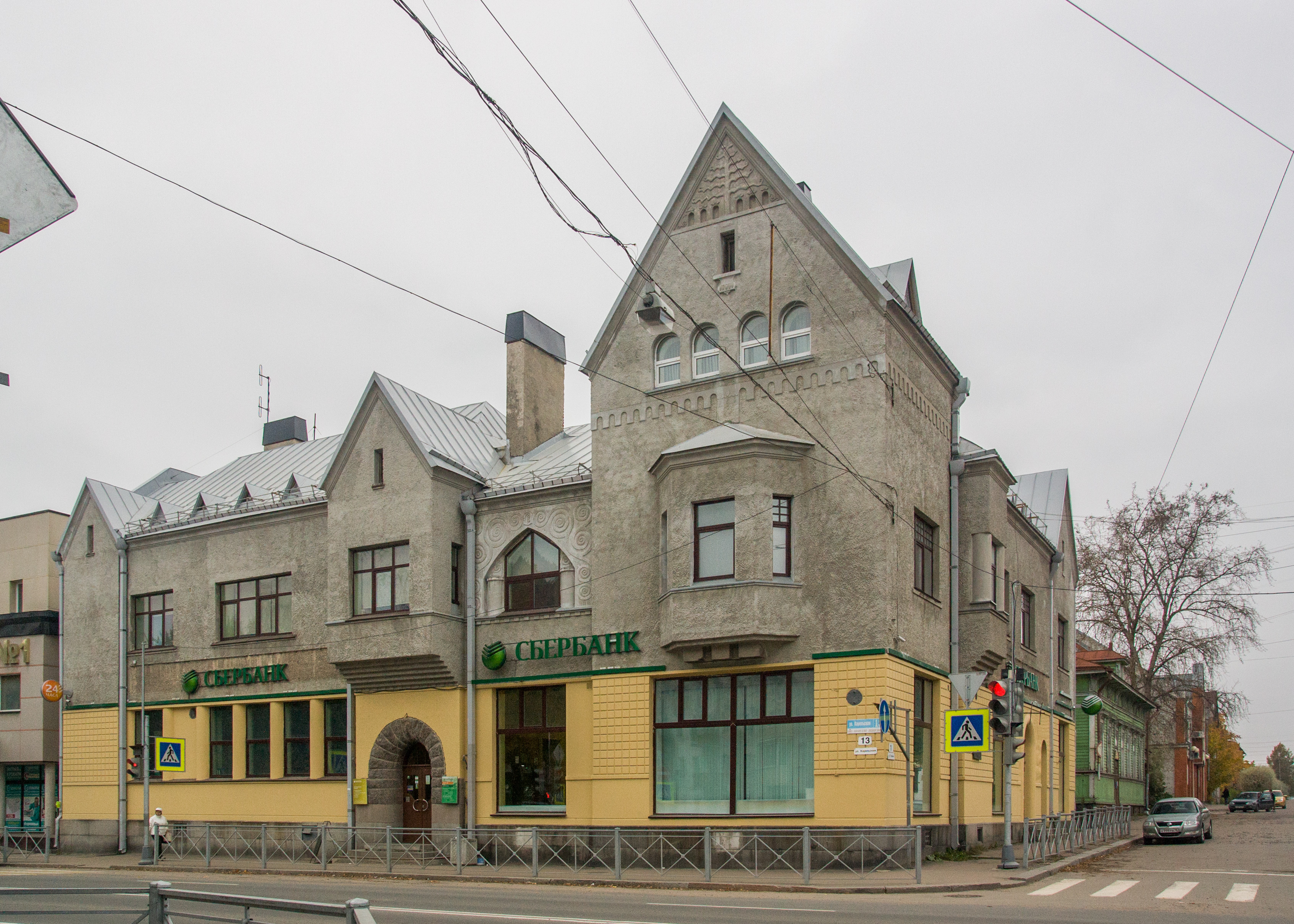
Bank in Sortavala

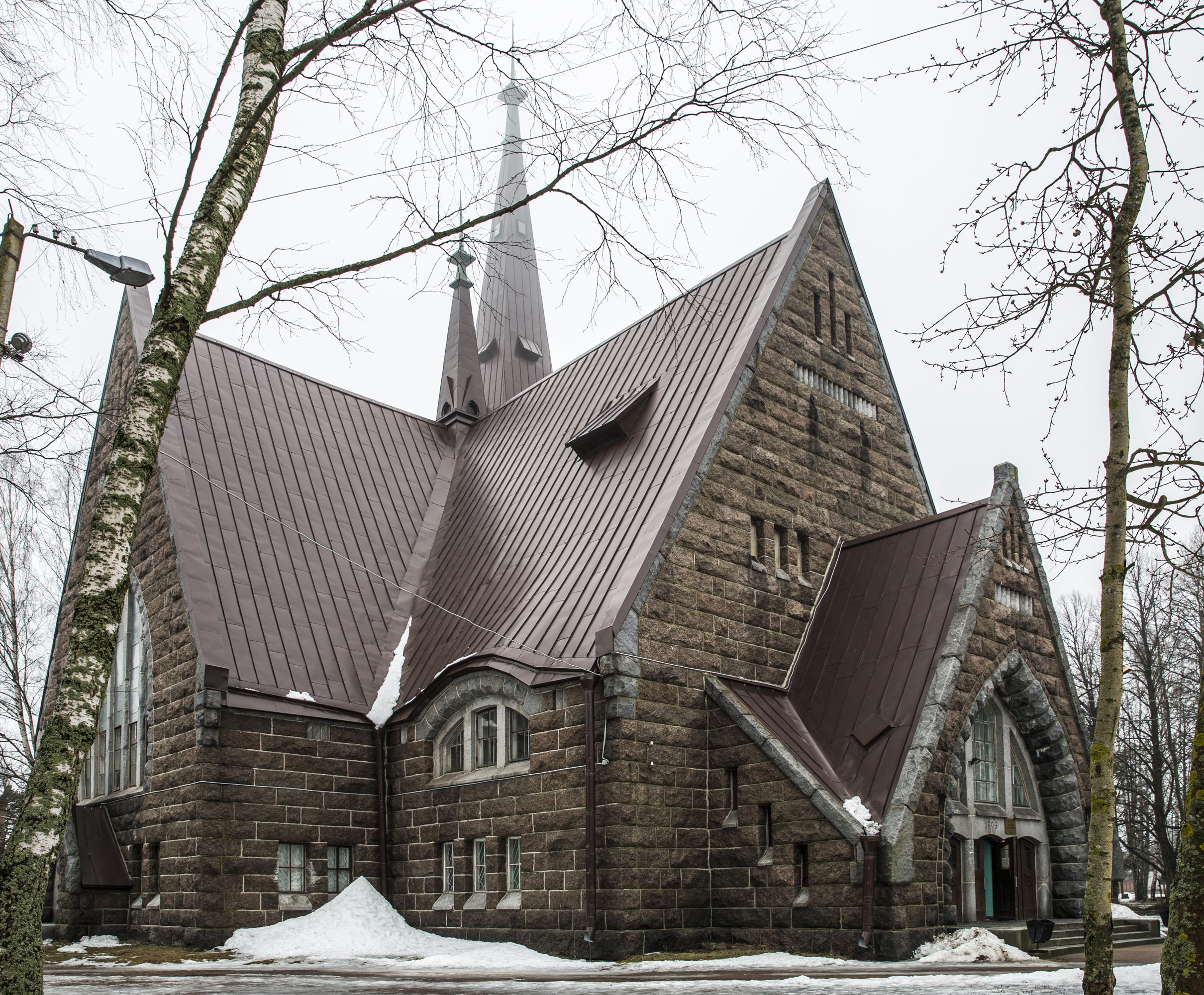
Ex-Lutheran church in Primorsk

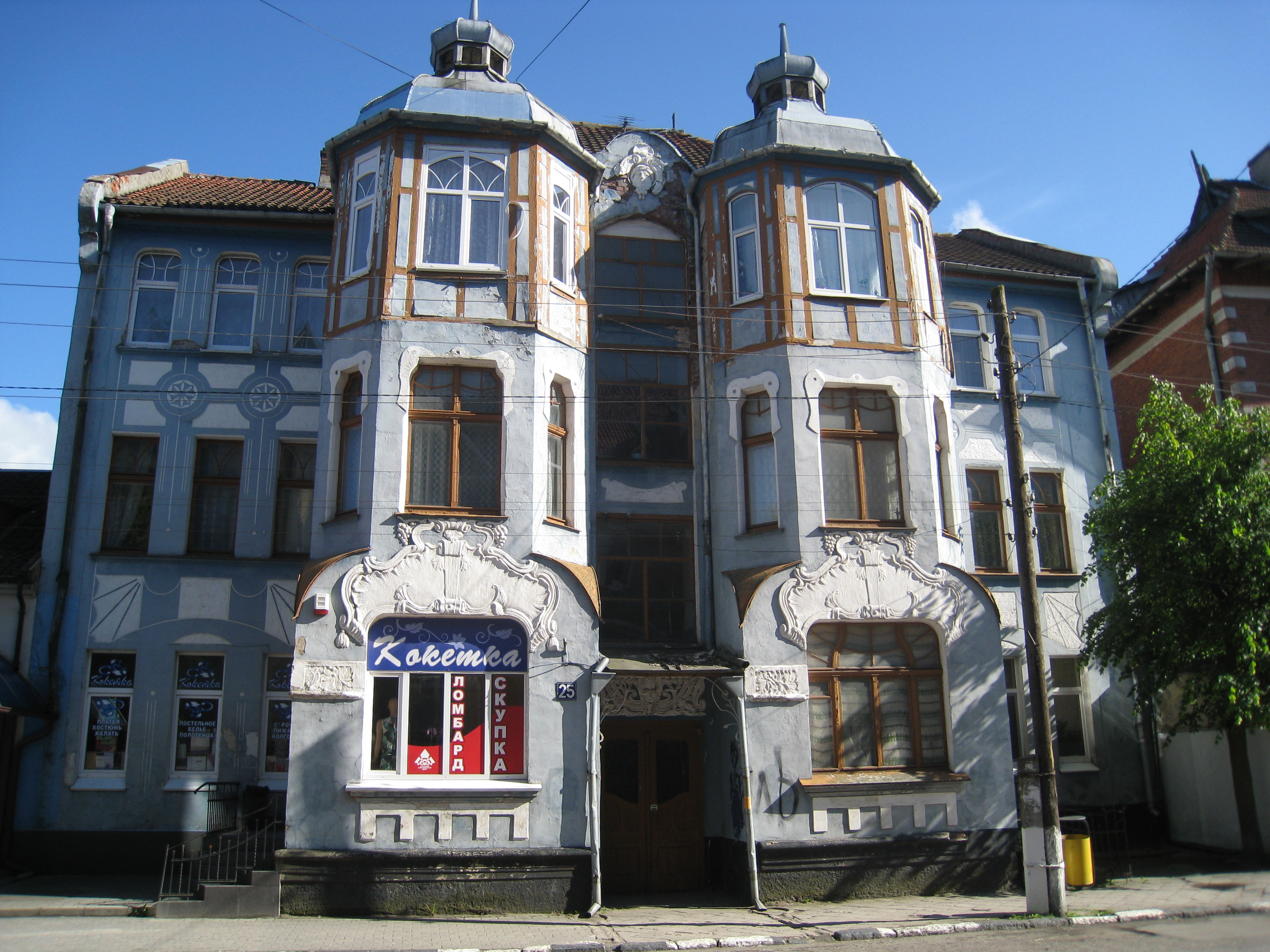
House in Zelenogradsk

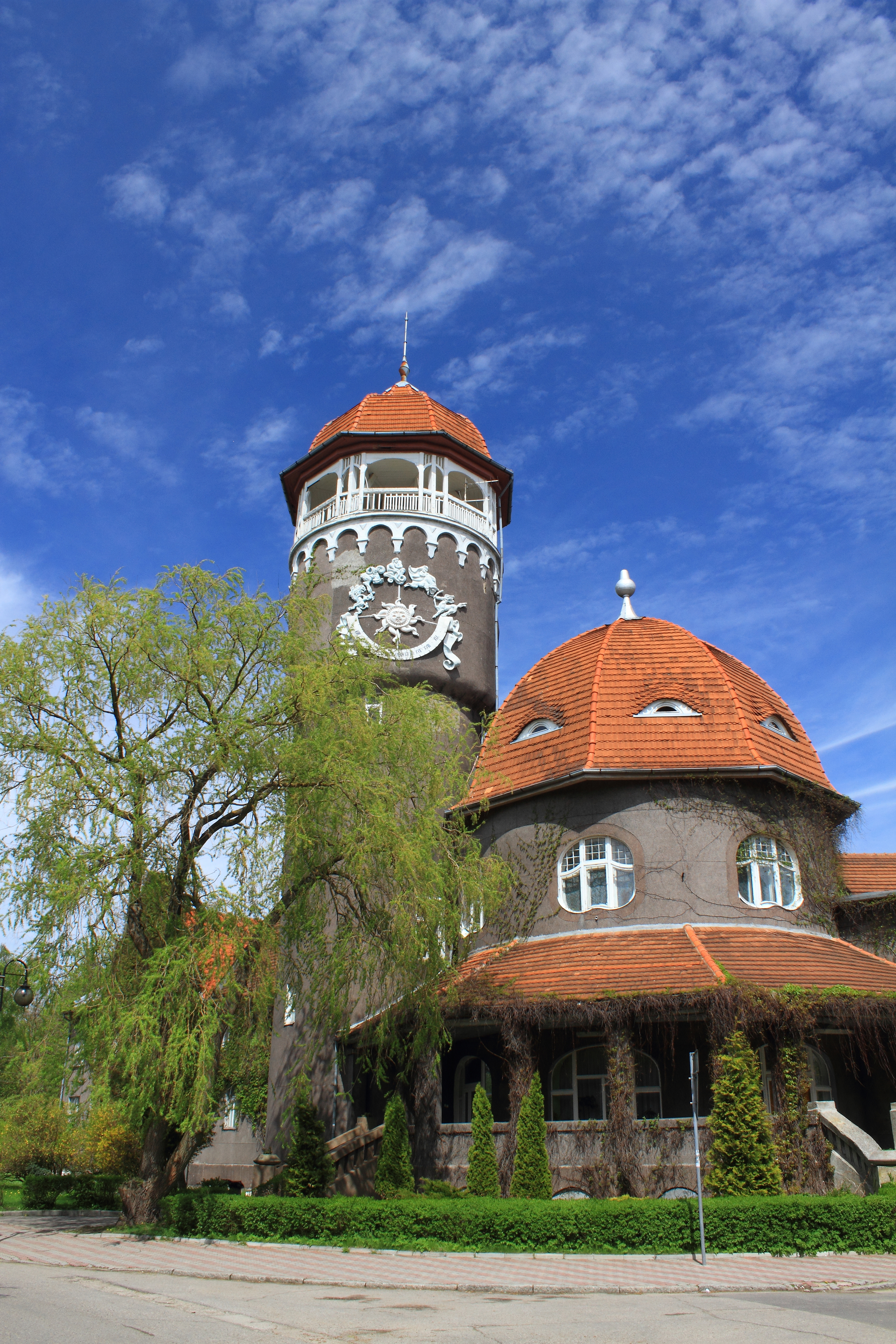
Water tower in Svetlogorsk

== Gallery of regional examples ==
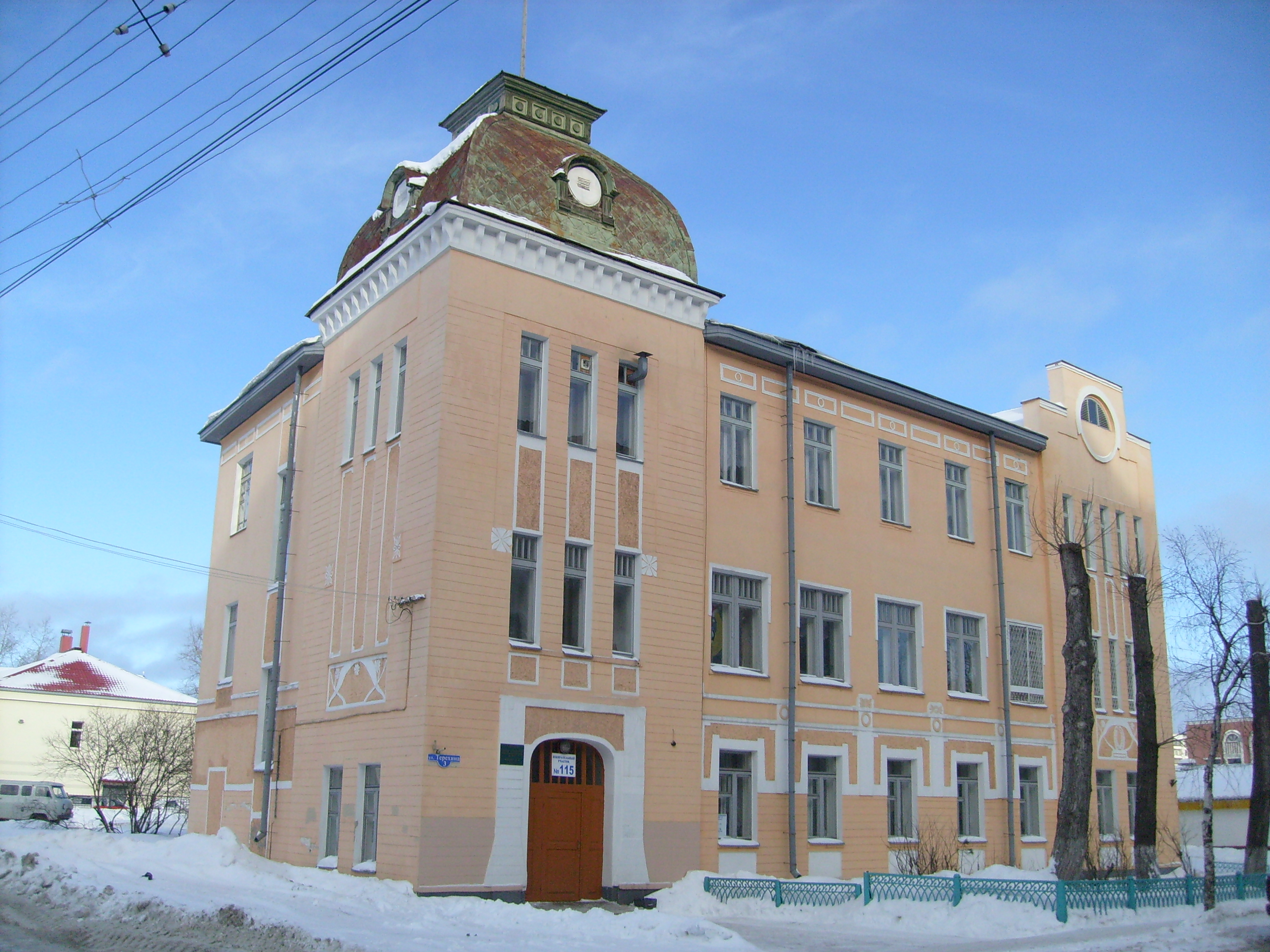
Arkhangelsk

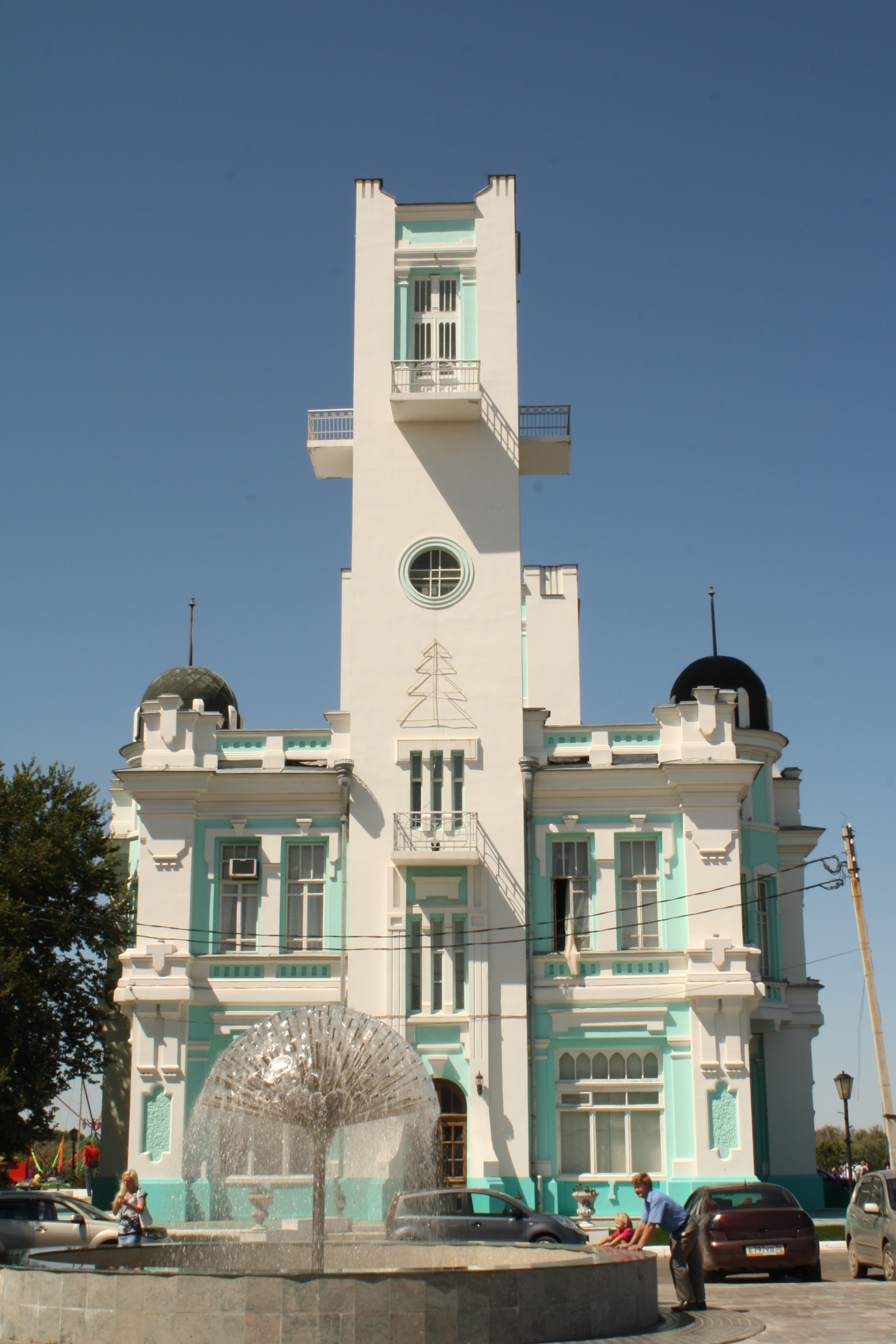
Astrakhan

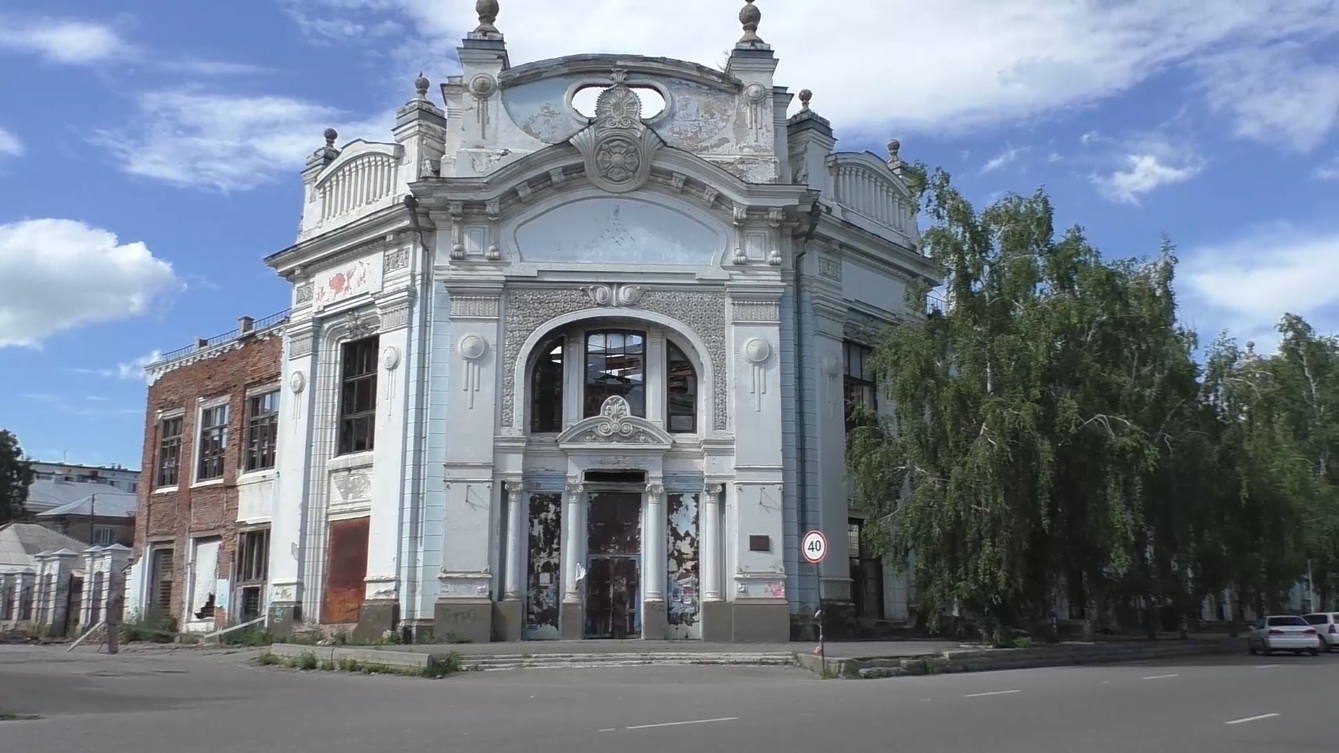
Biysk

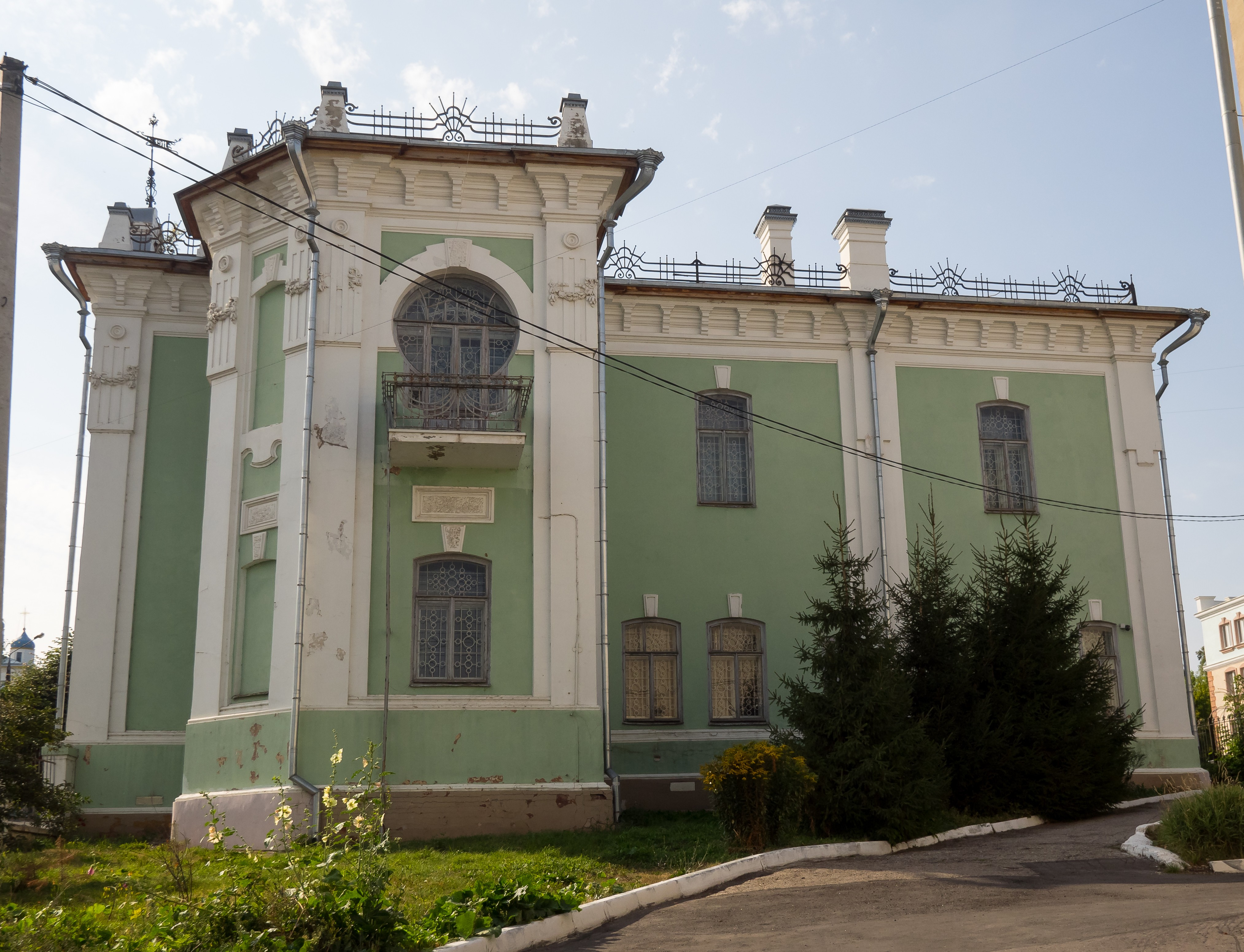
Cheboksary

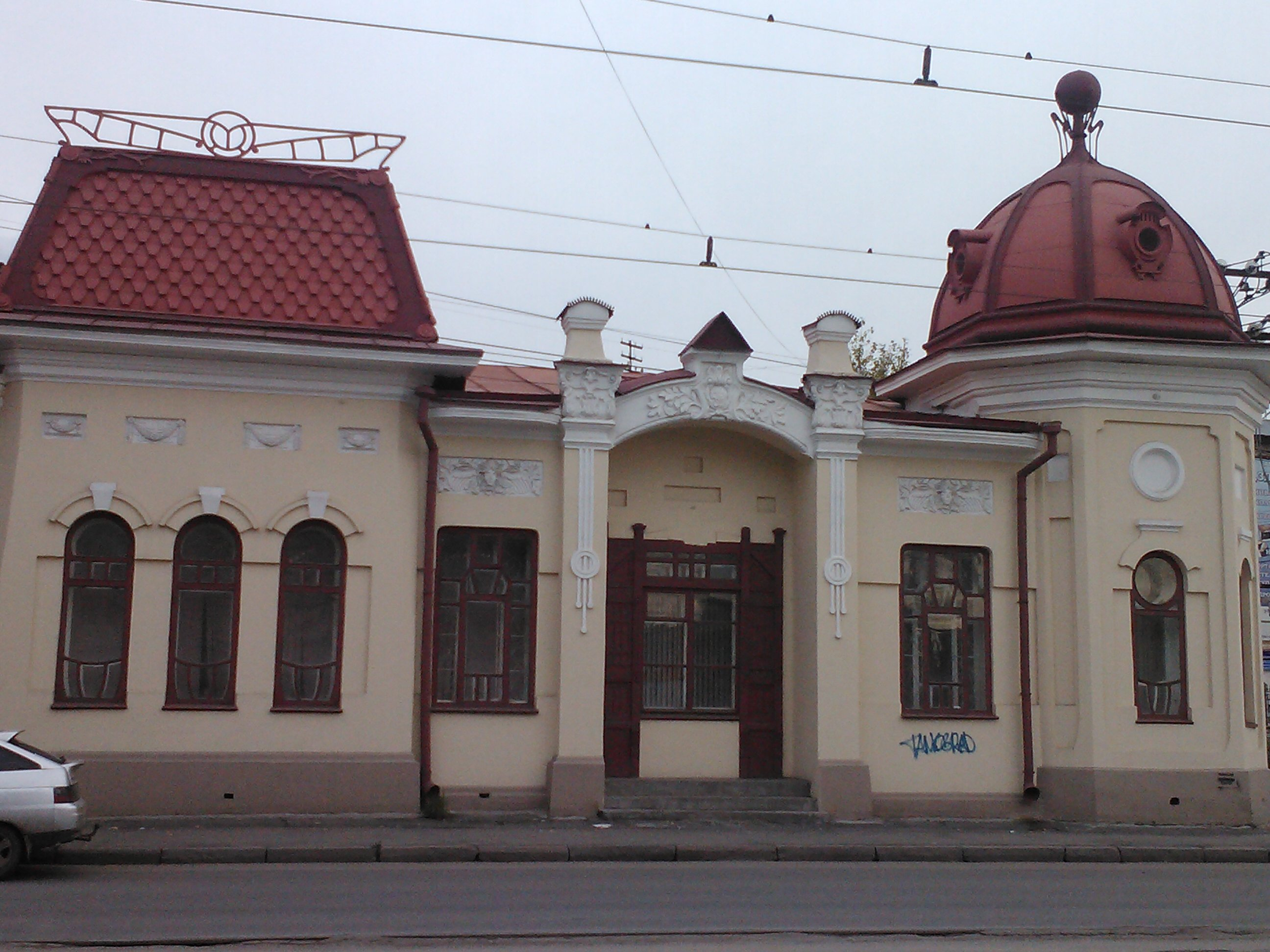
Chelyabinsk

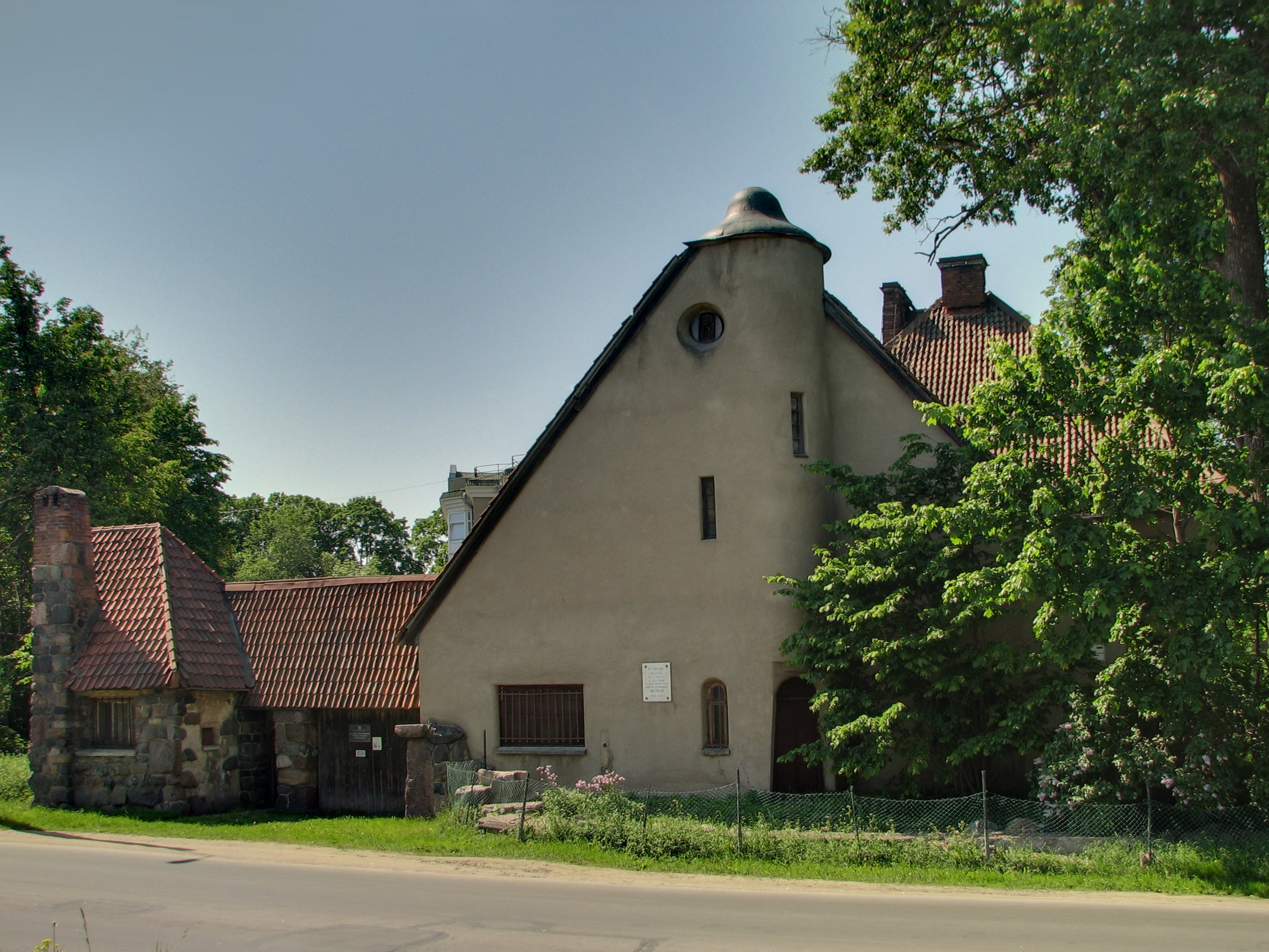
Gatchina

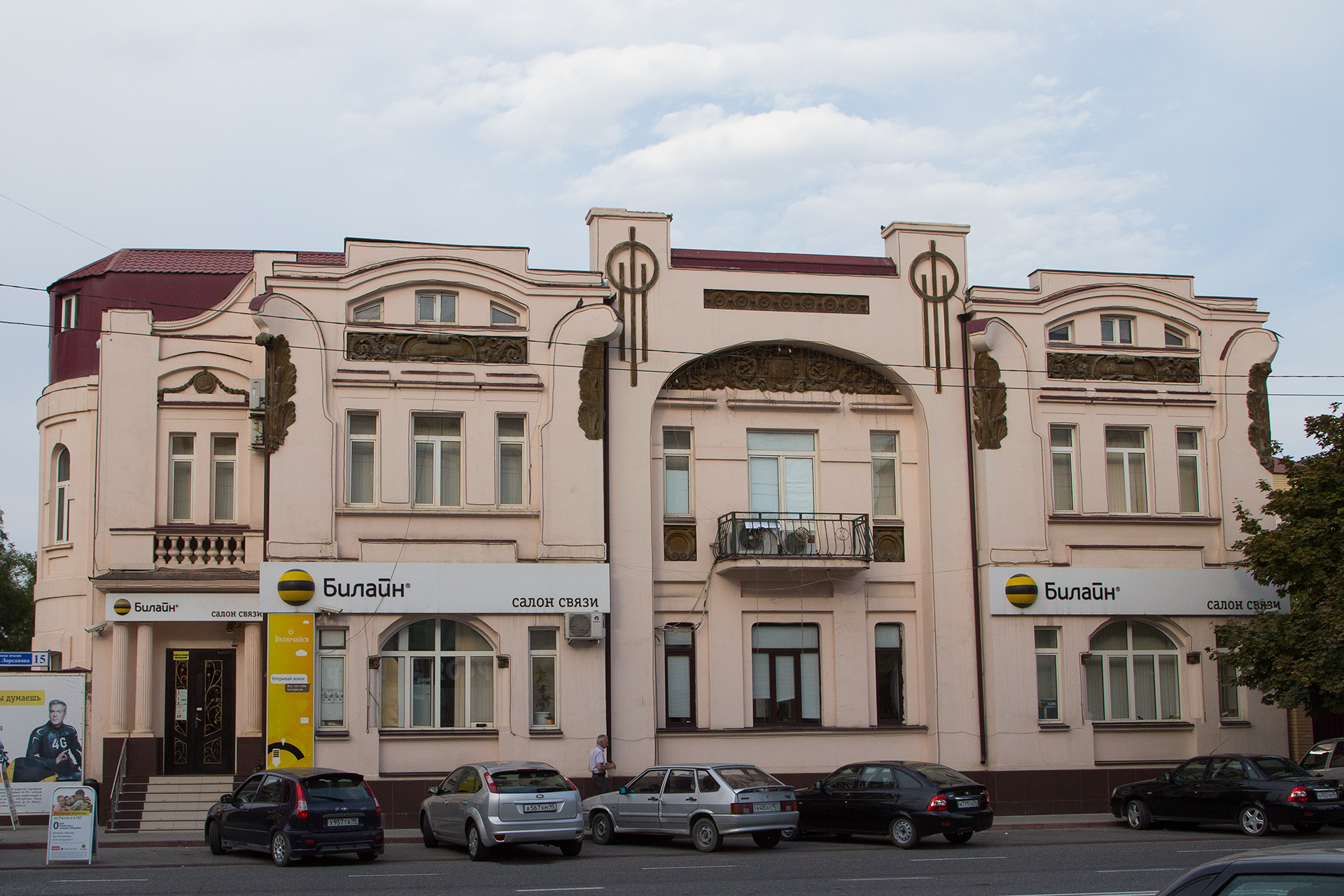
Grozny

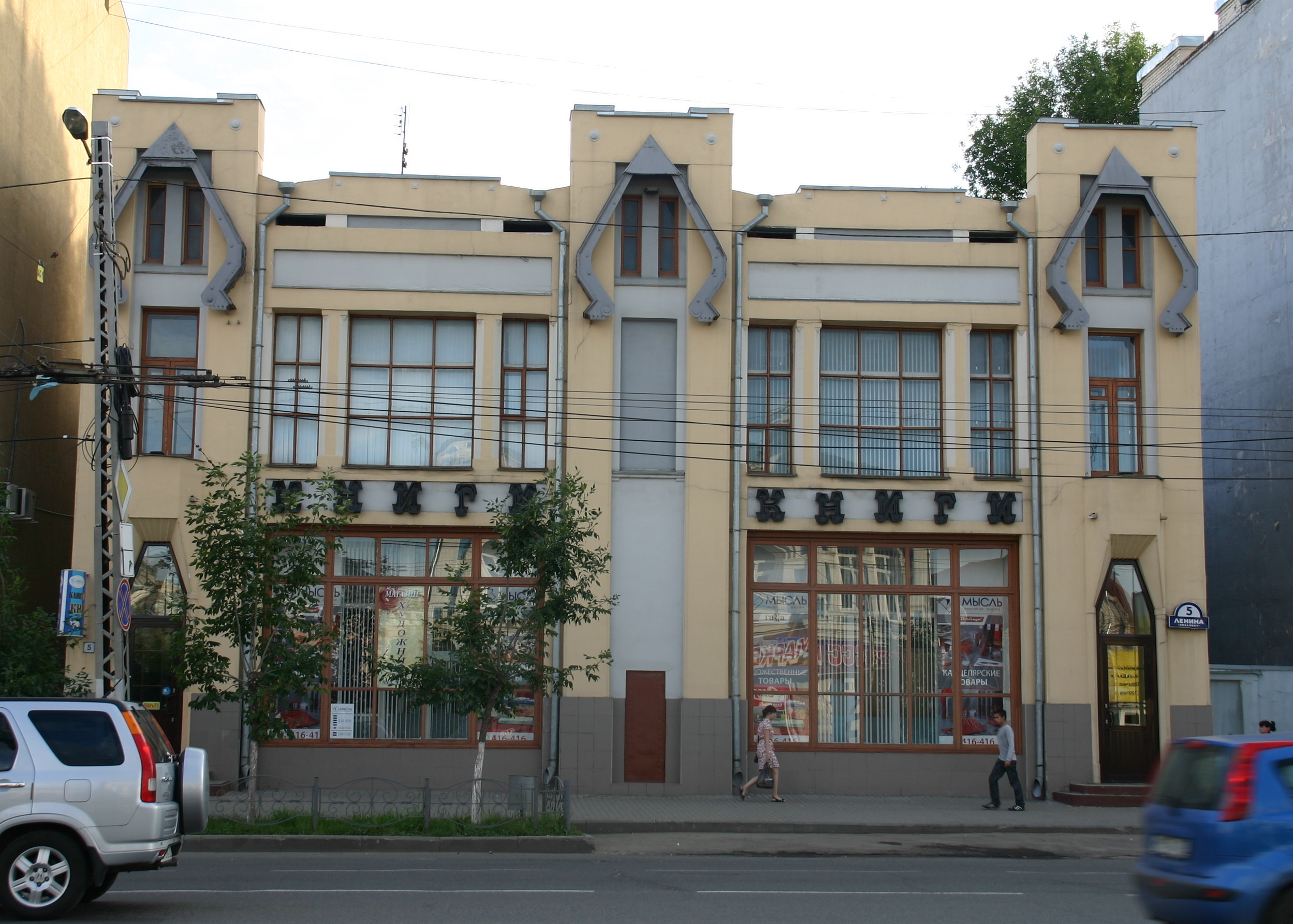
Ivanovo

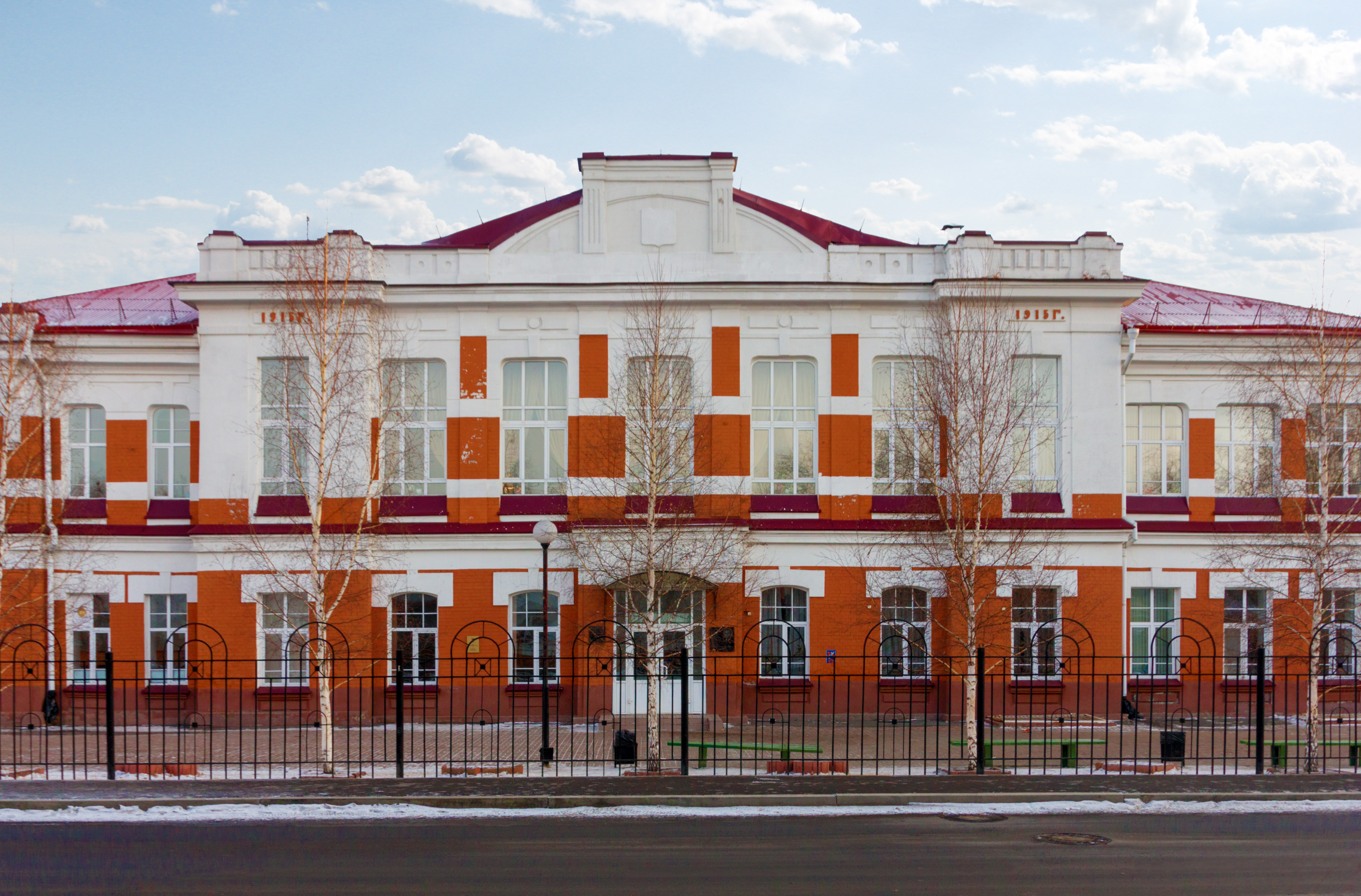
Irkutsk

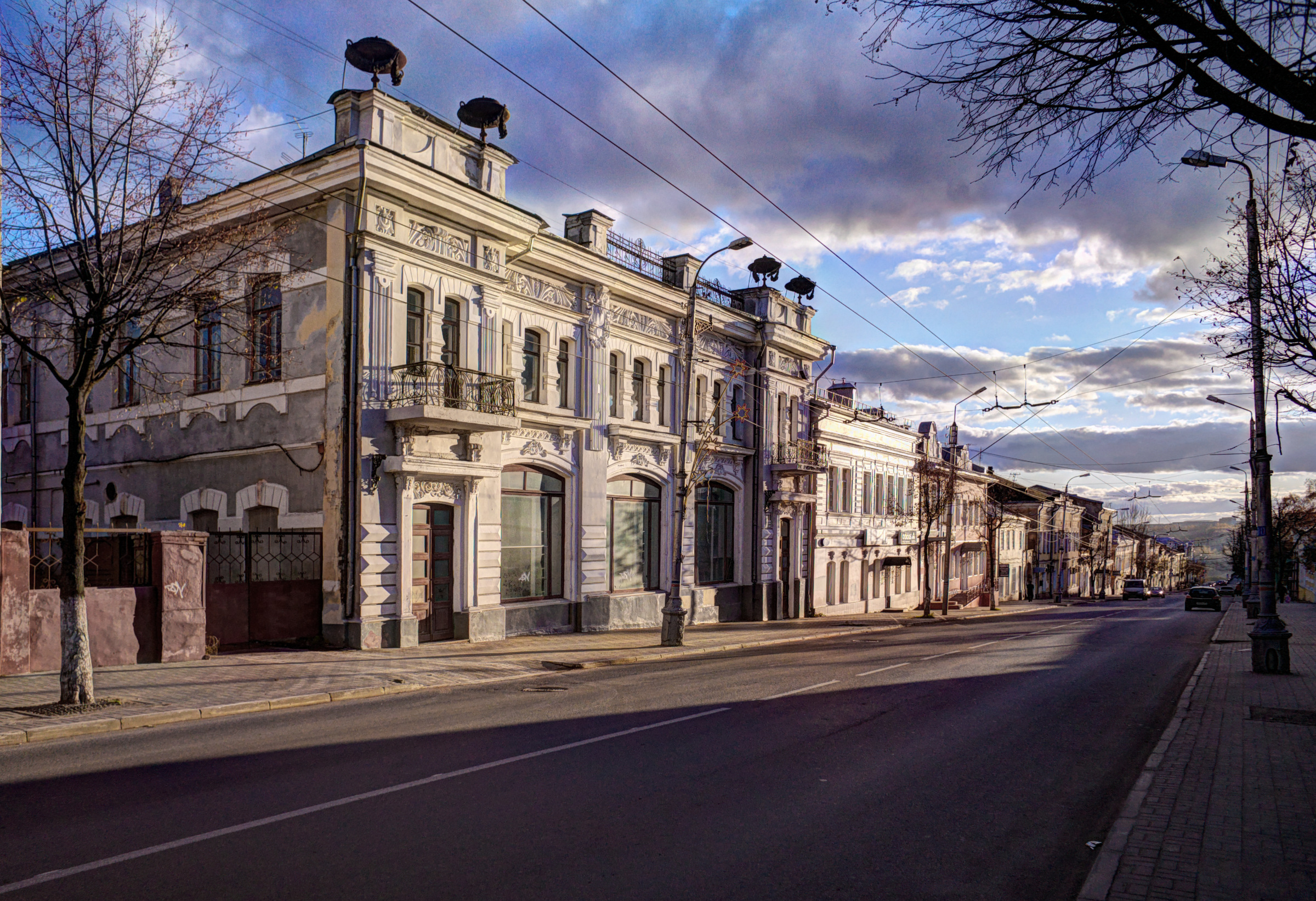
Kaluga

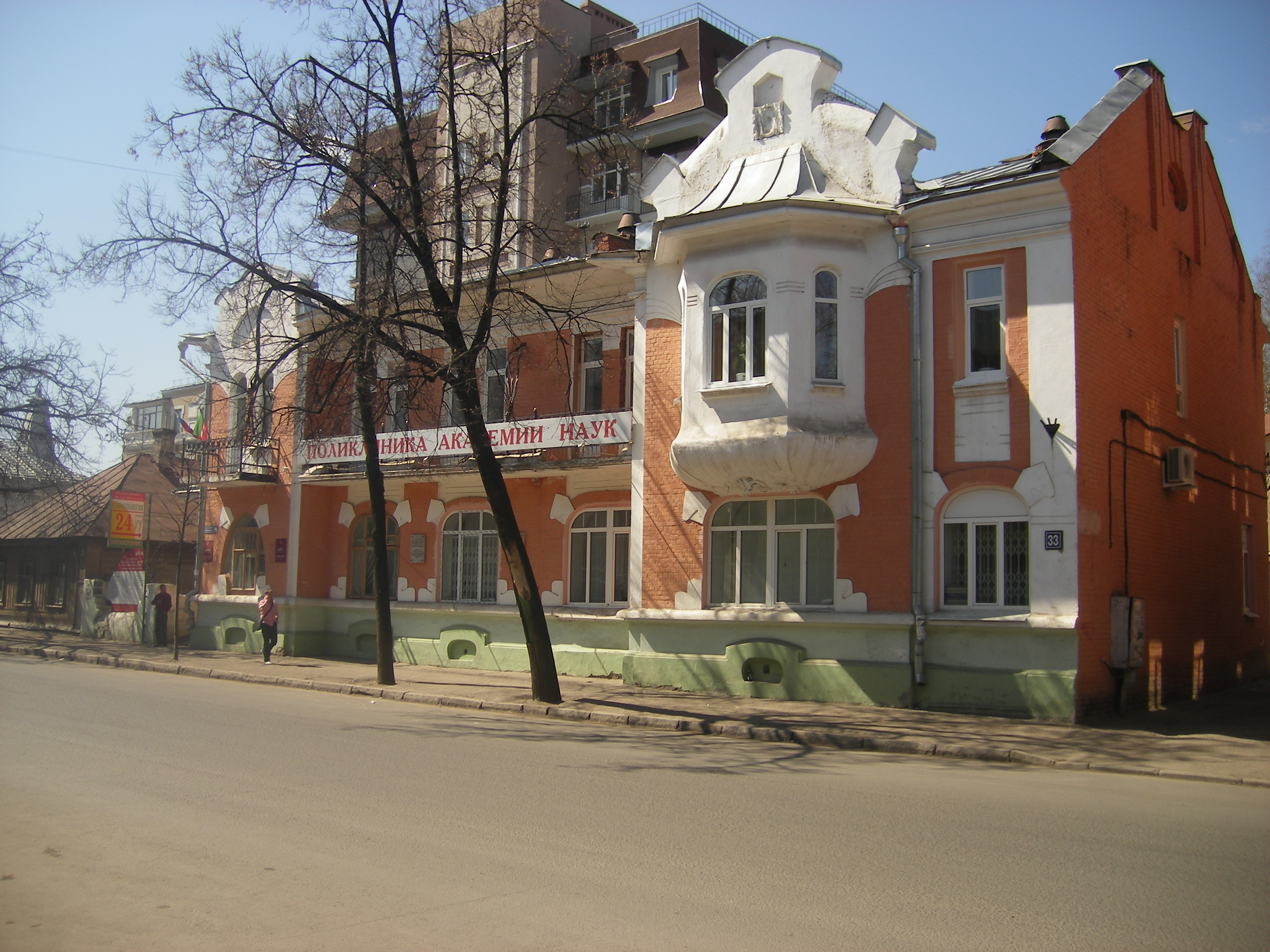
Kazan

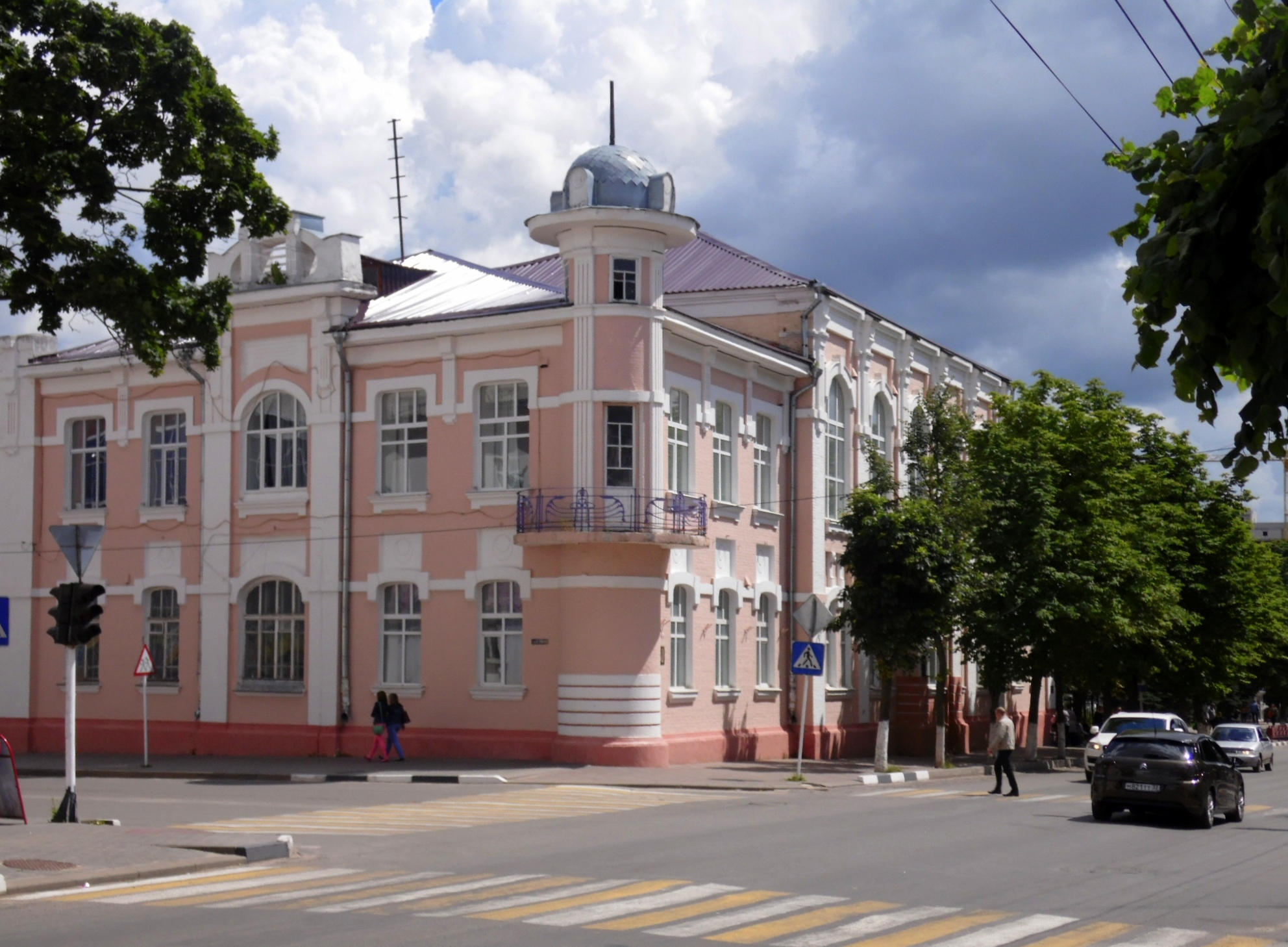
Klintsy

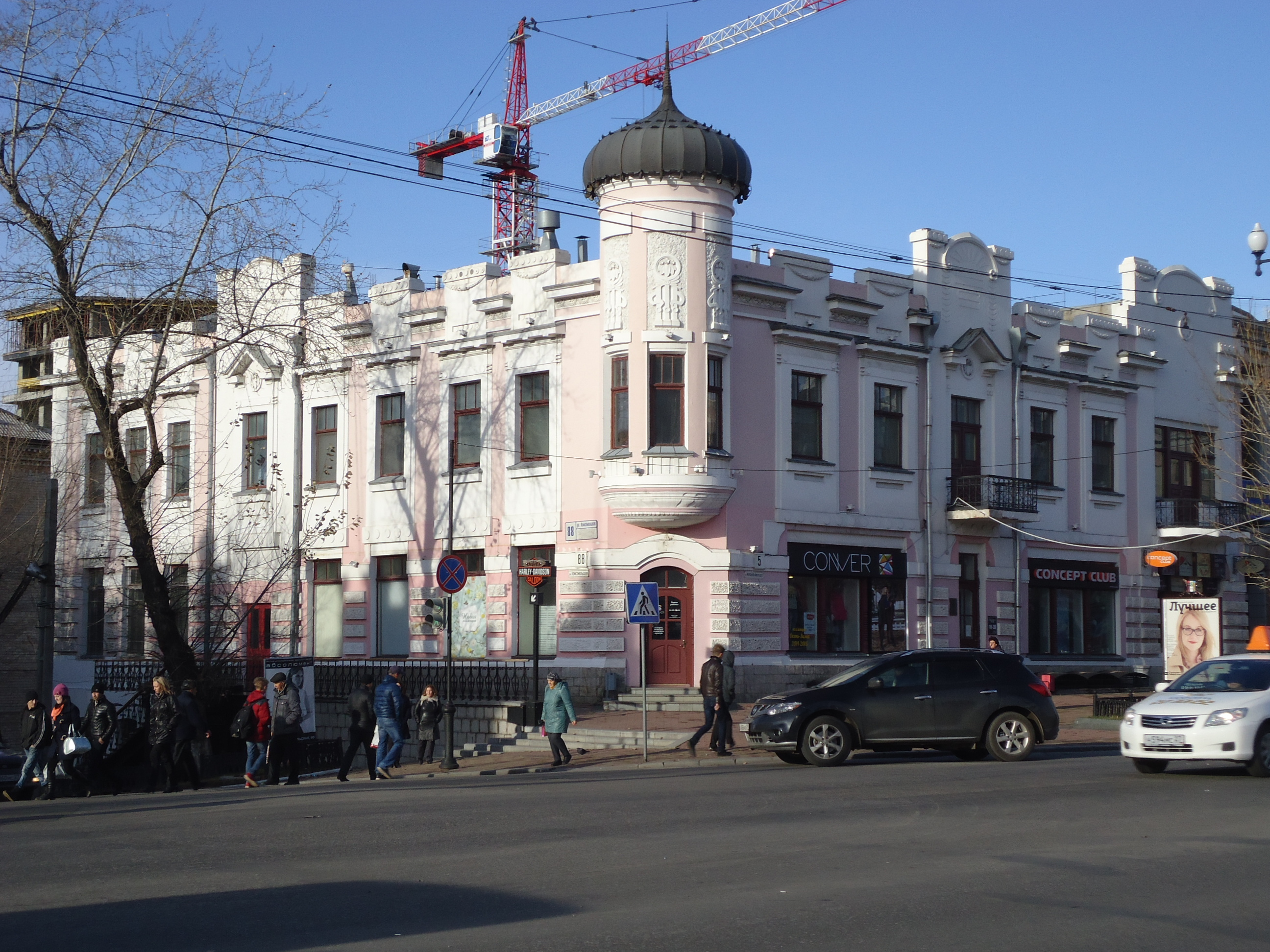
Khabarovsk

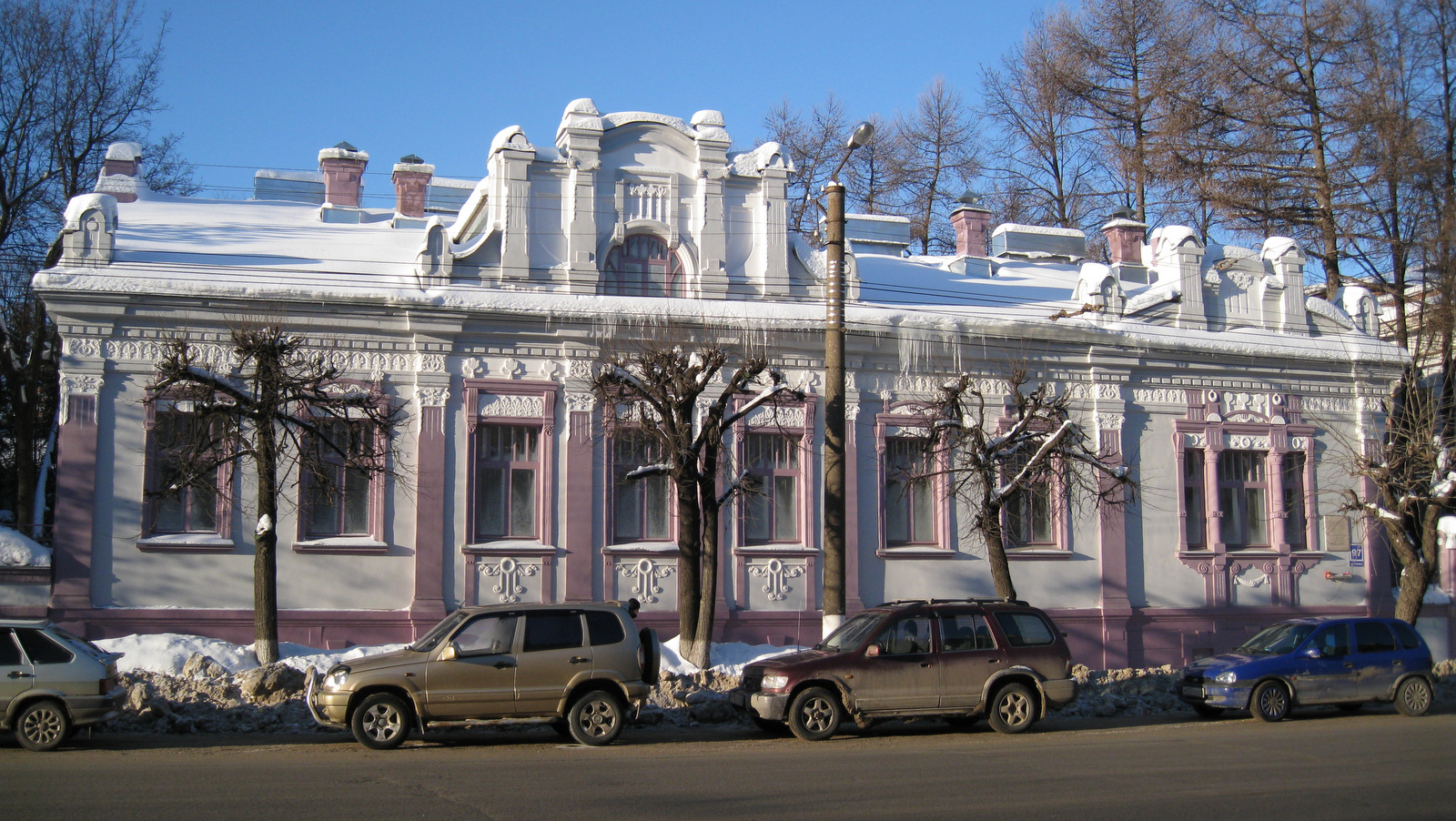
Kirov

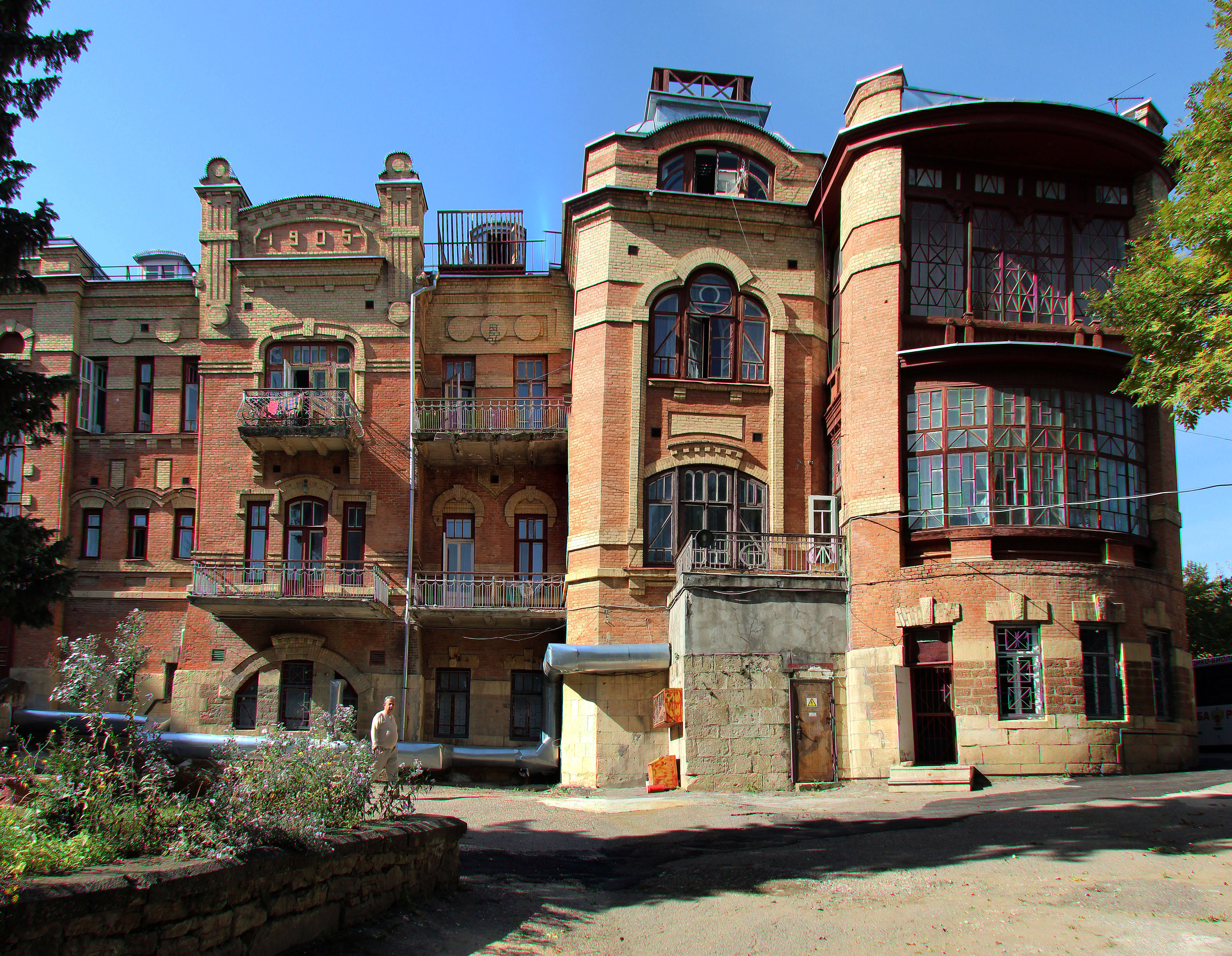
Kislovodsk

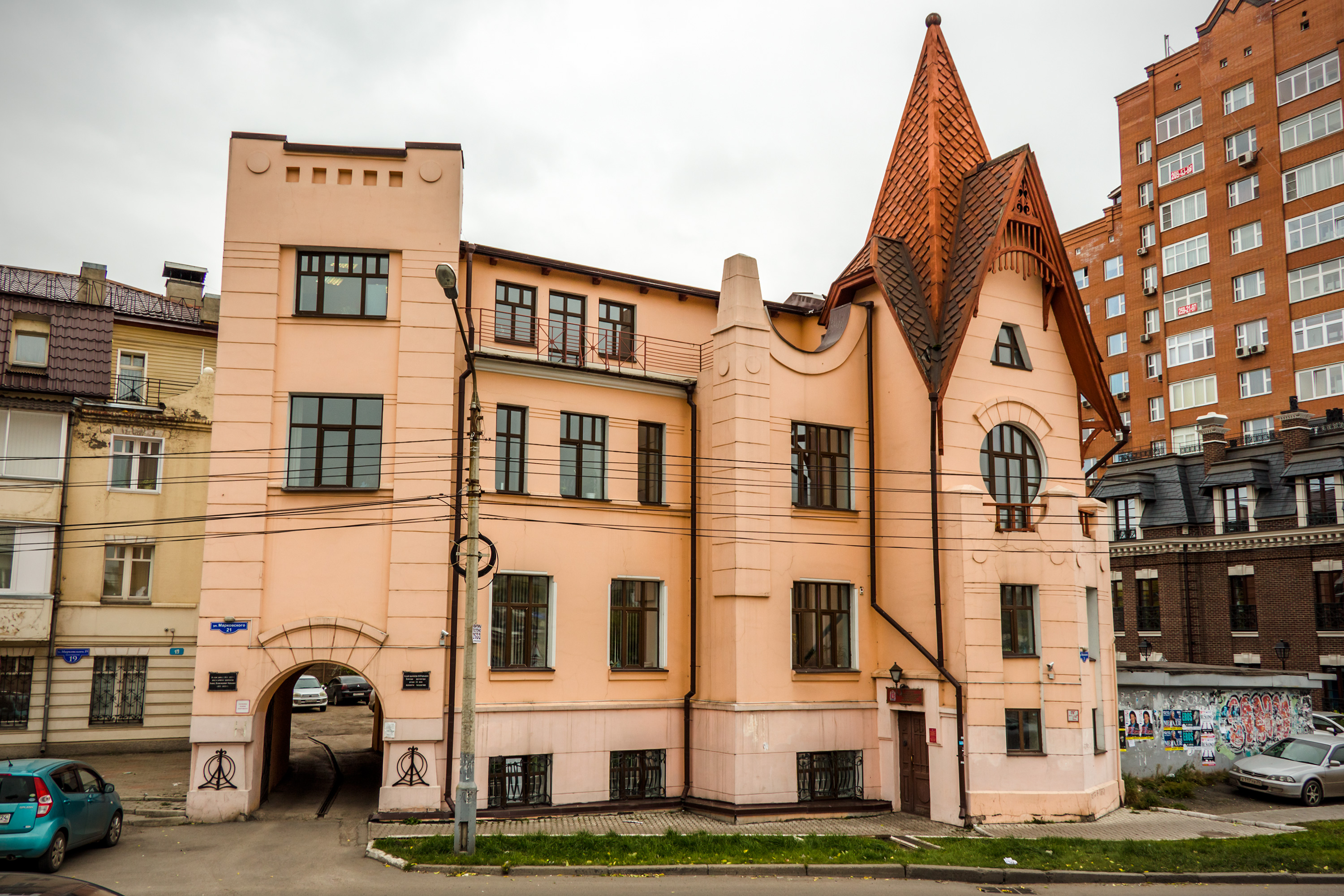
Krasnoyarsk

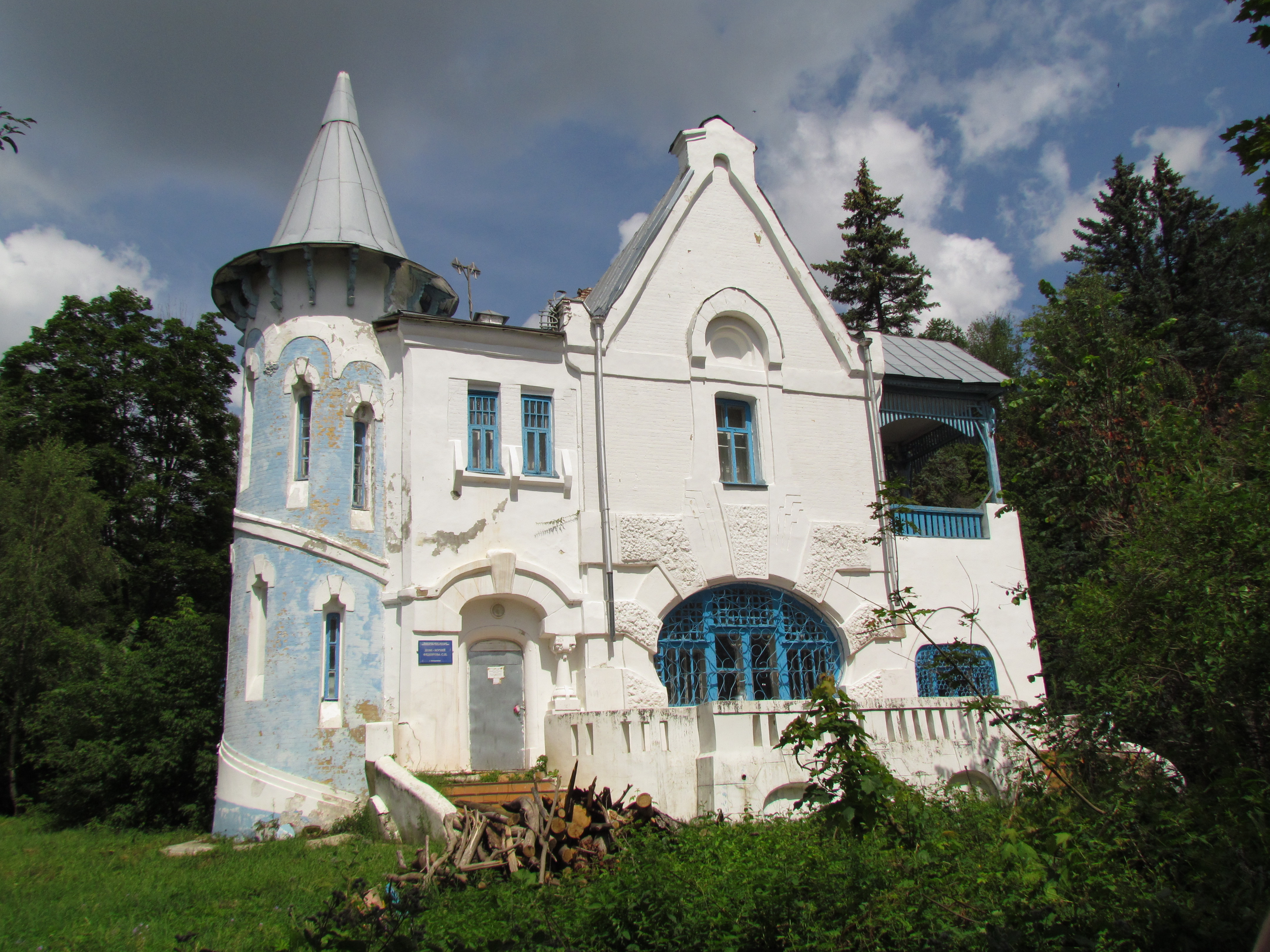
Maloyaroslavets

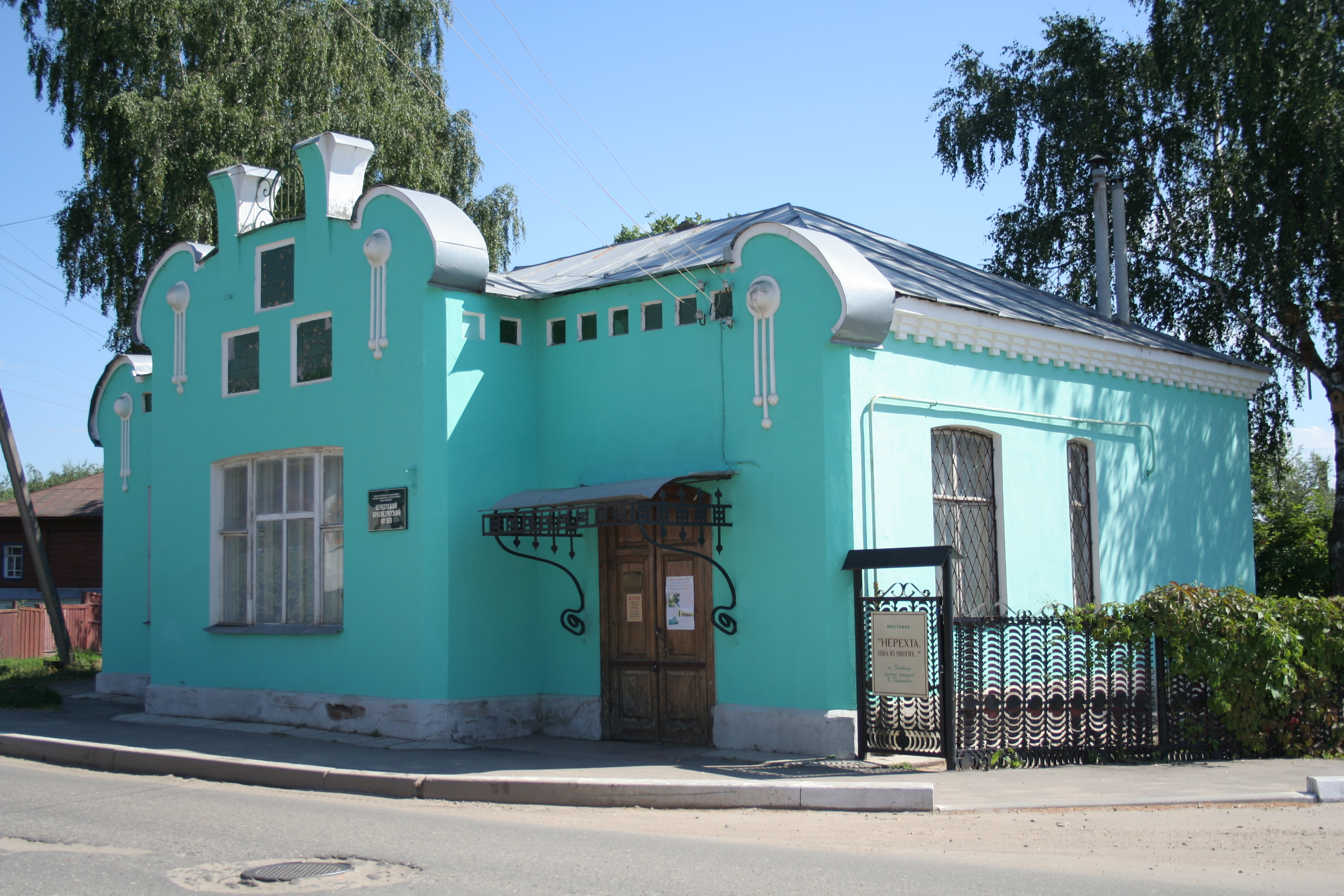
Nerekhta

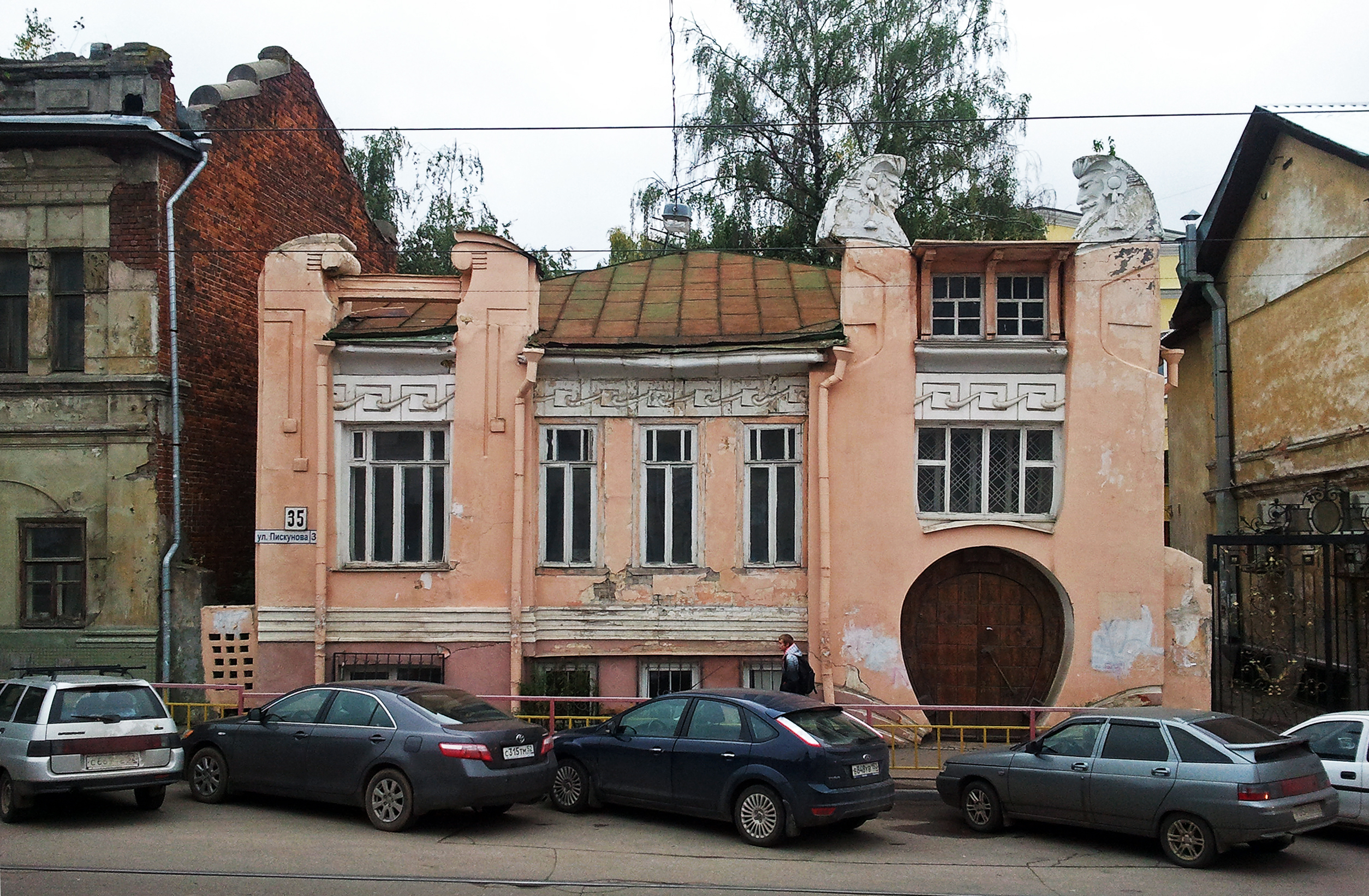
Nizhny Novgorod

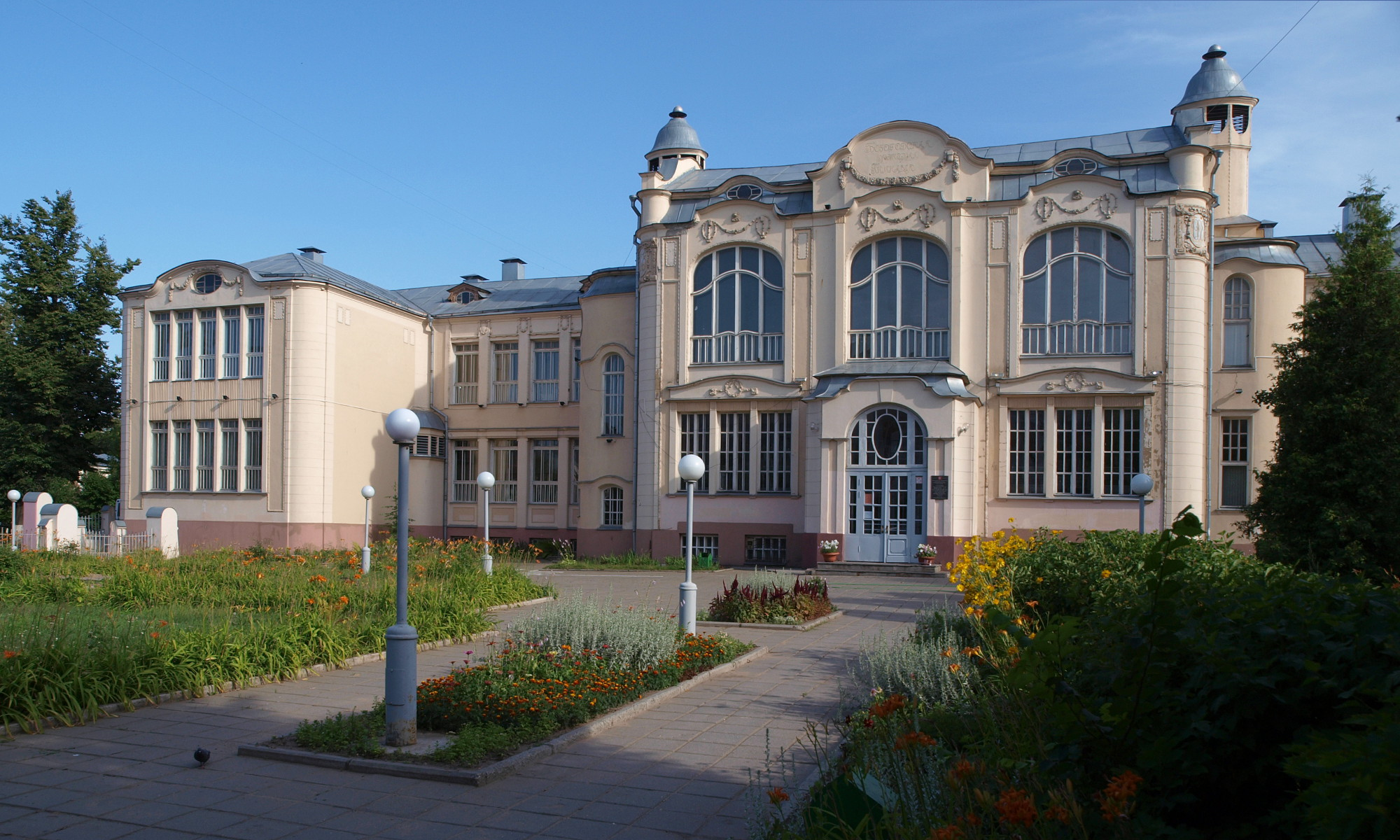
Noginsk

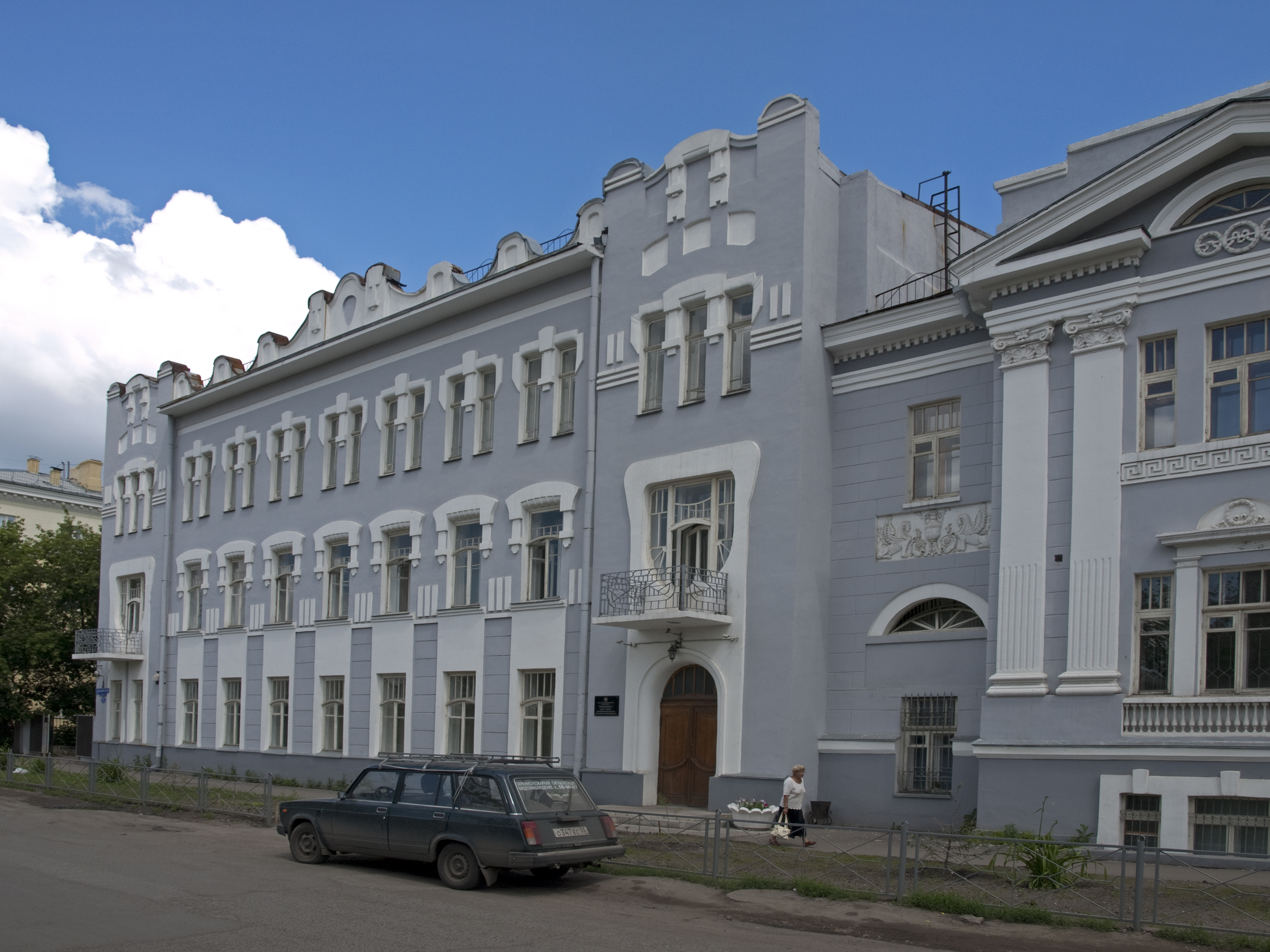
Omsk

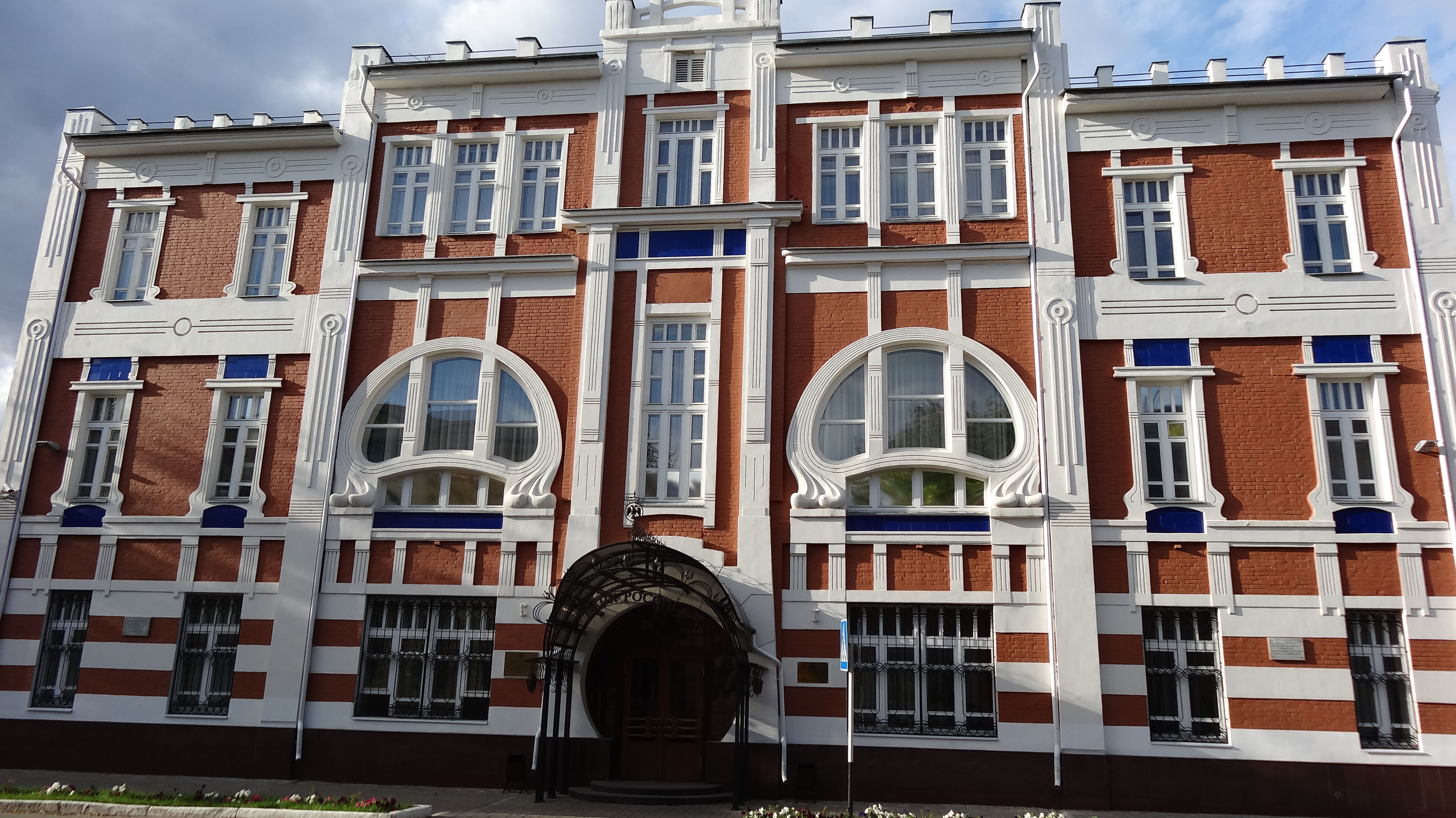
Orenburg

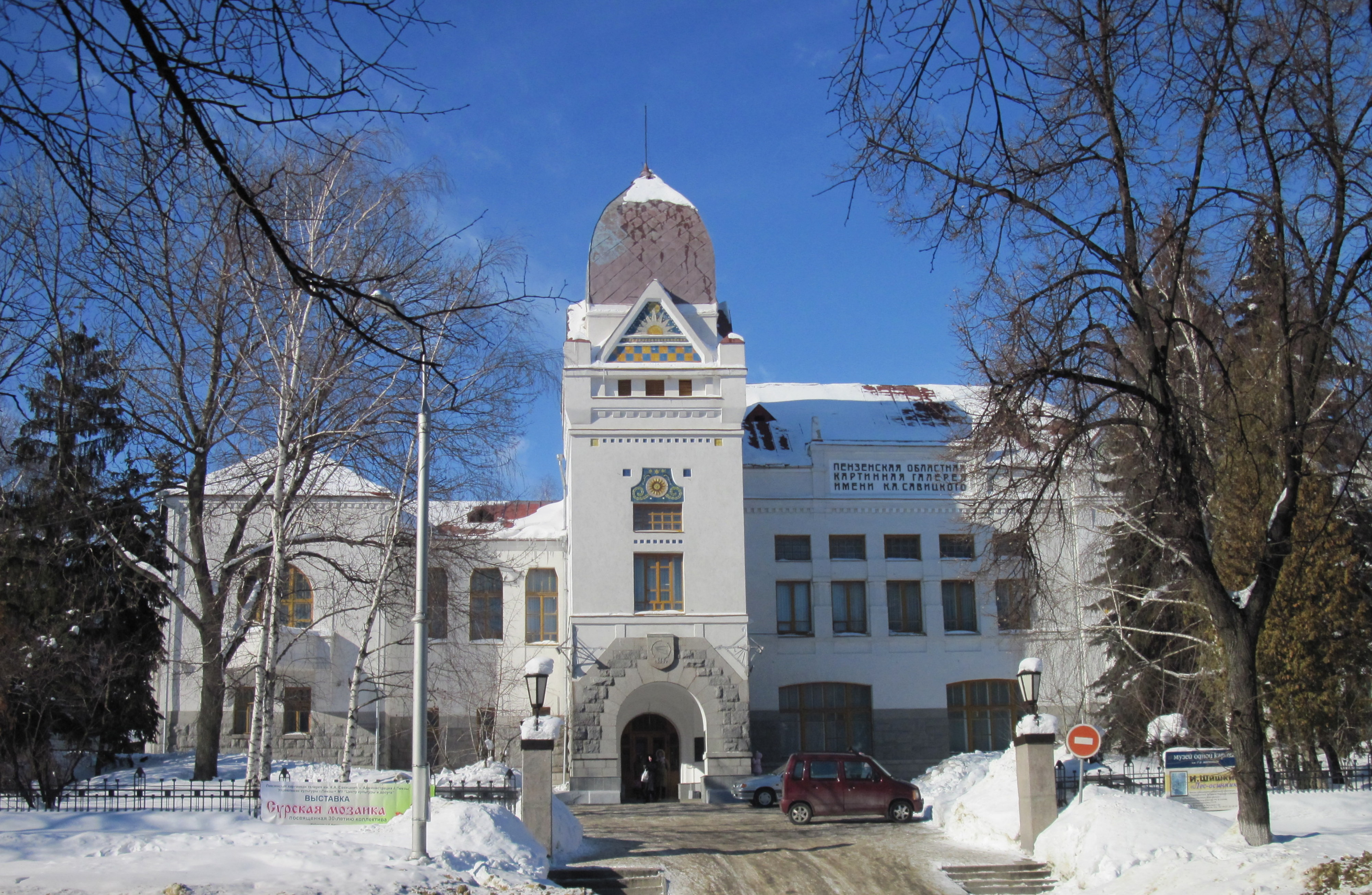
Penza

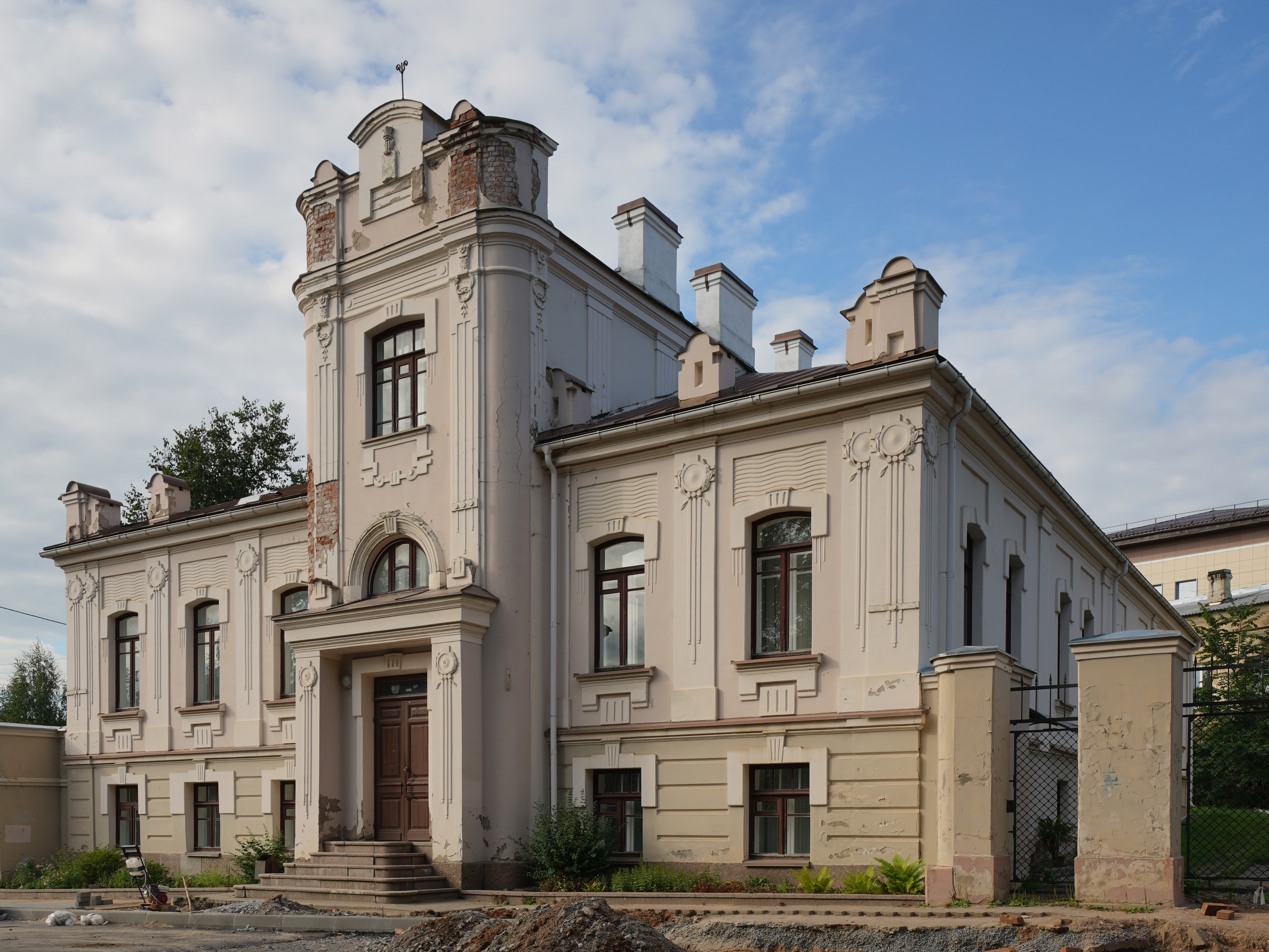
Pskov

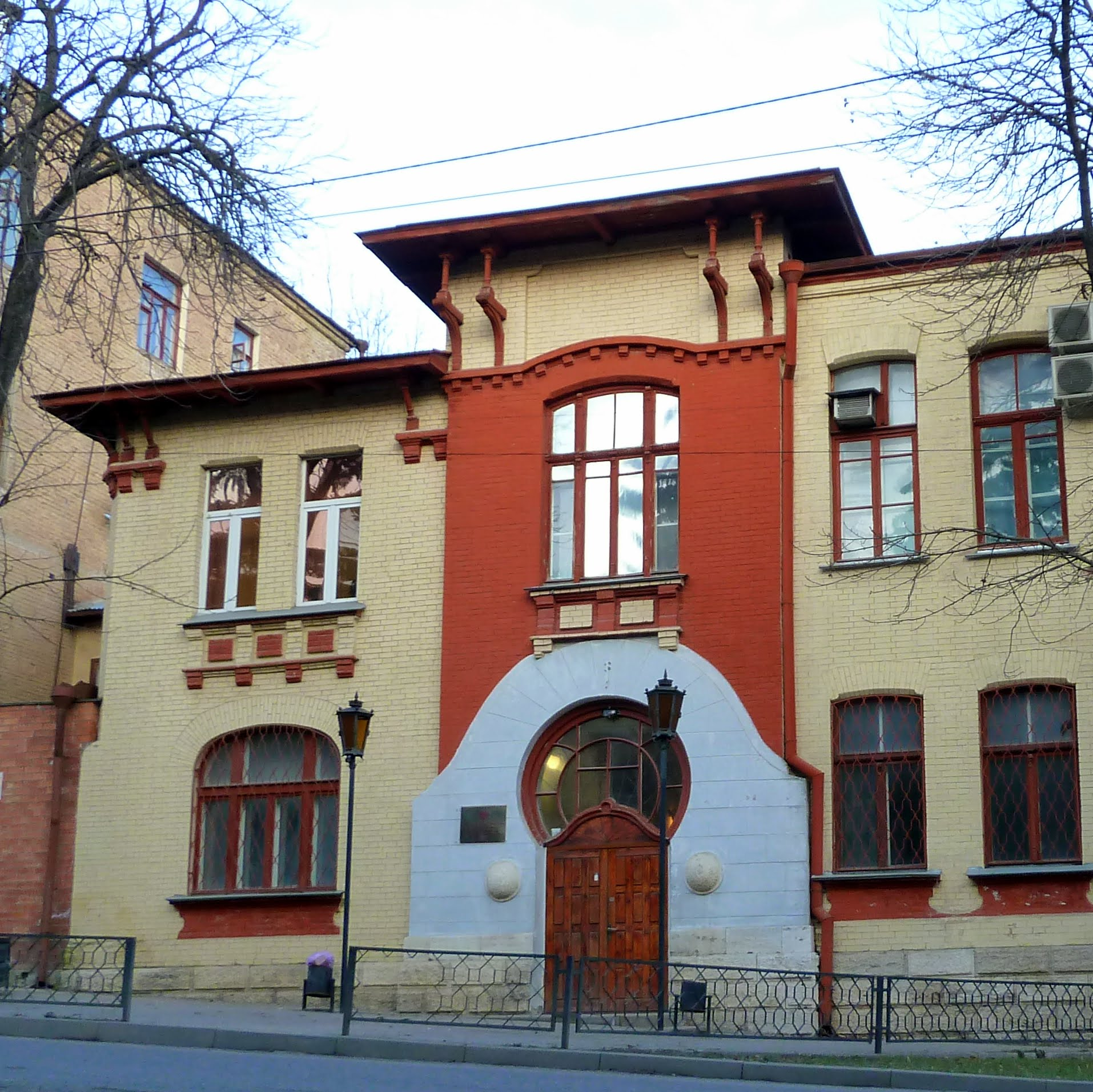
Pyatigorsk

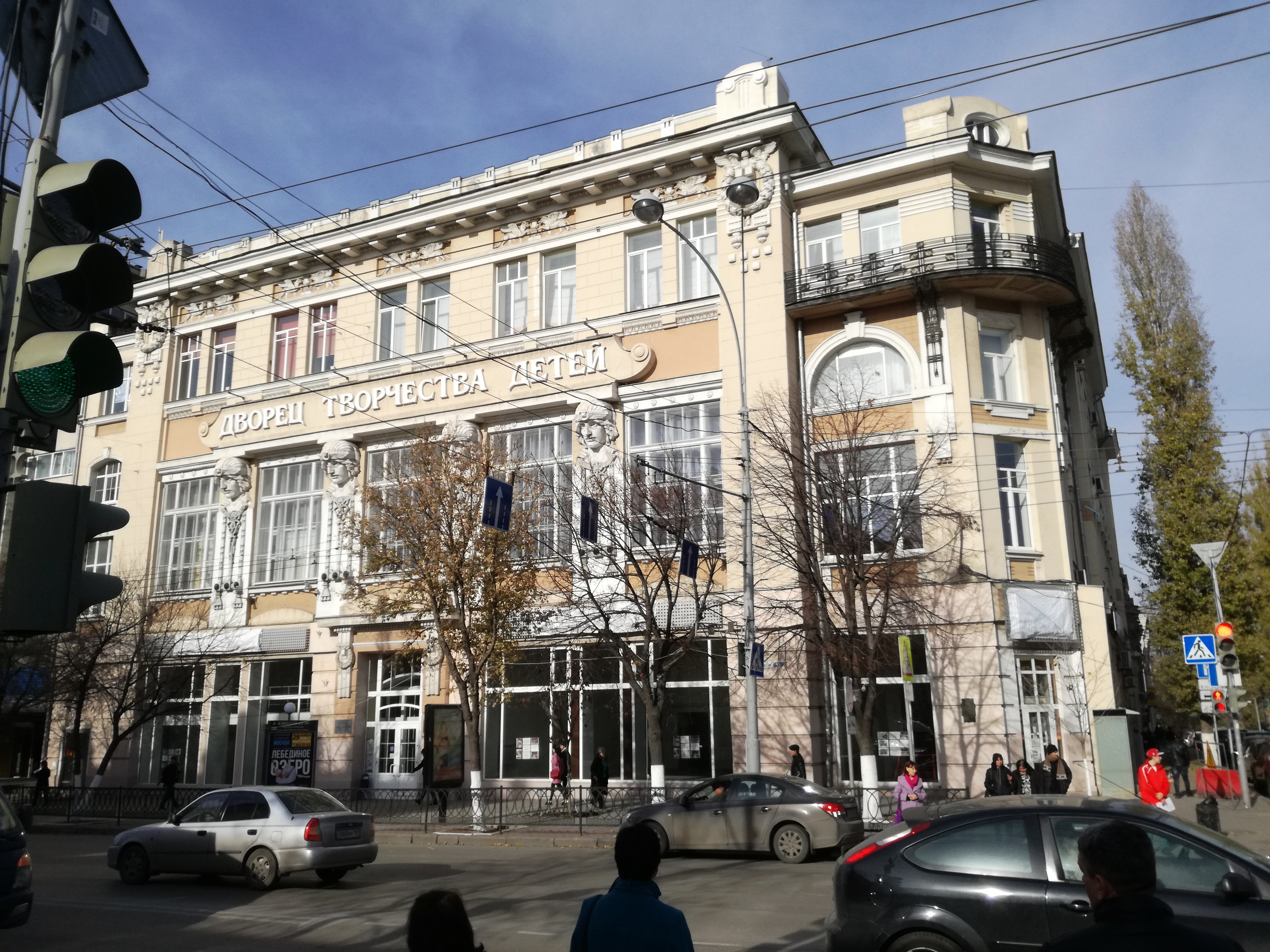
Rostov-on-Don

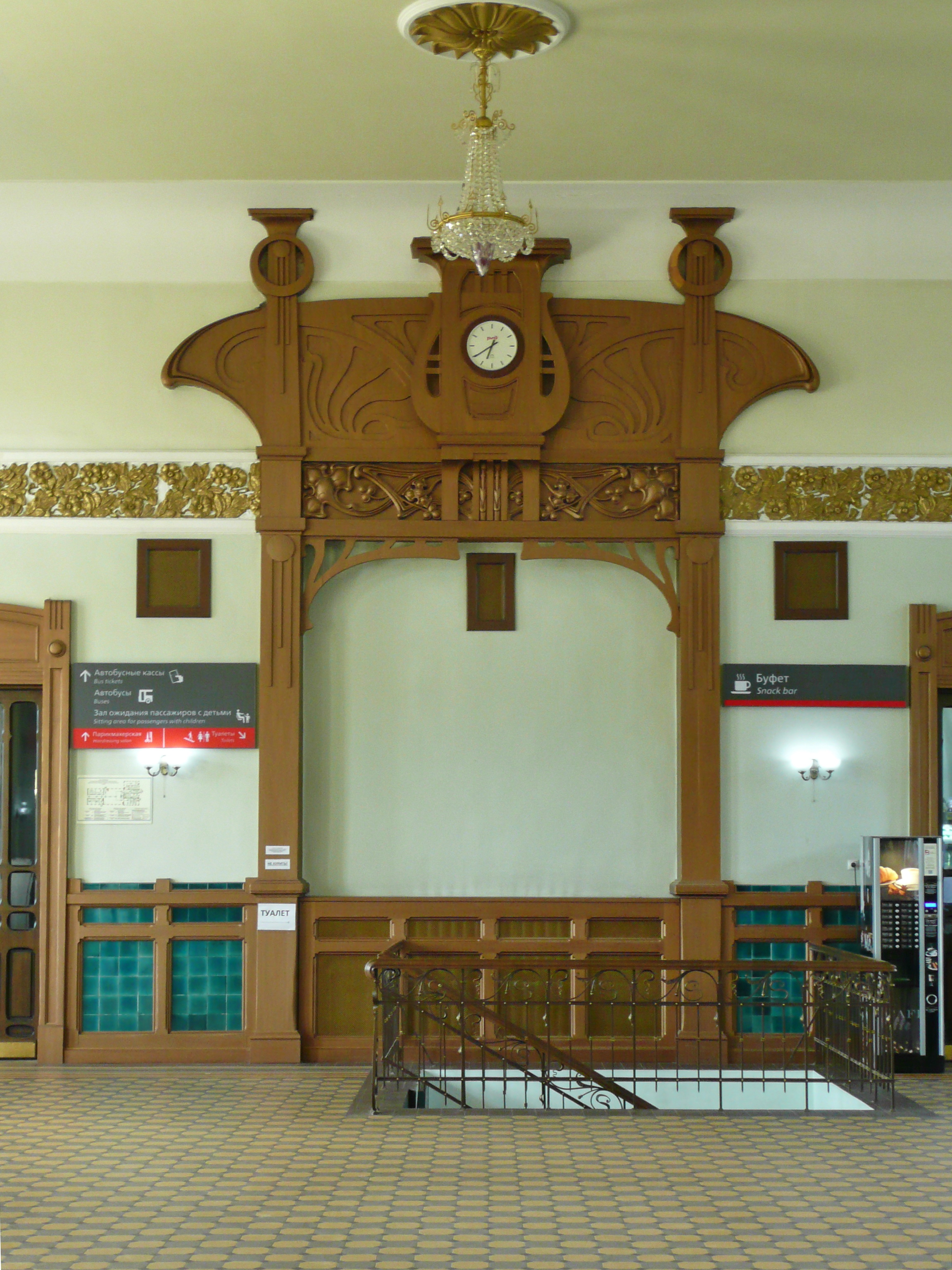
Rybinsk

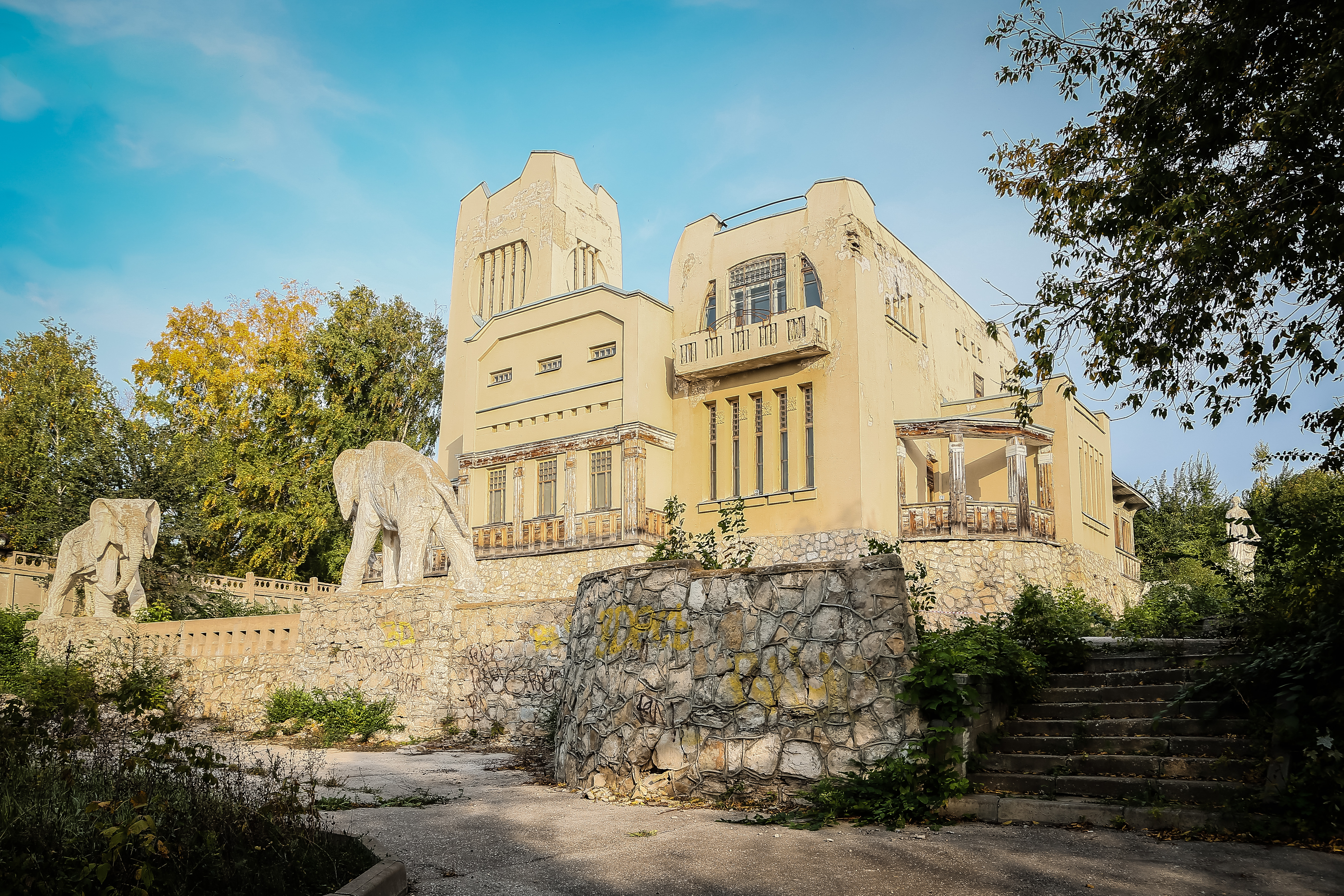
Samara

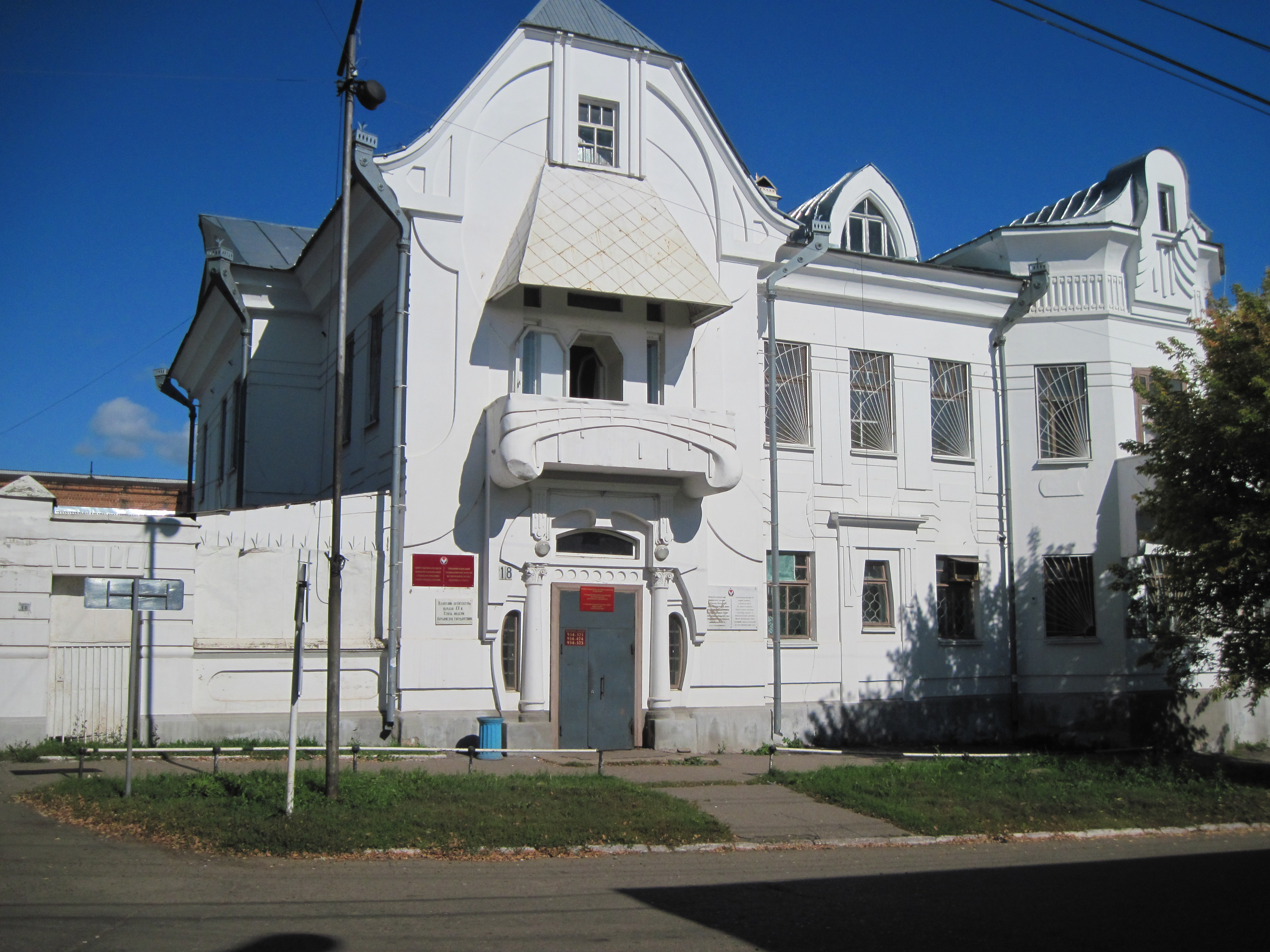
Sarapul

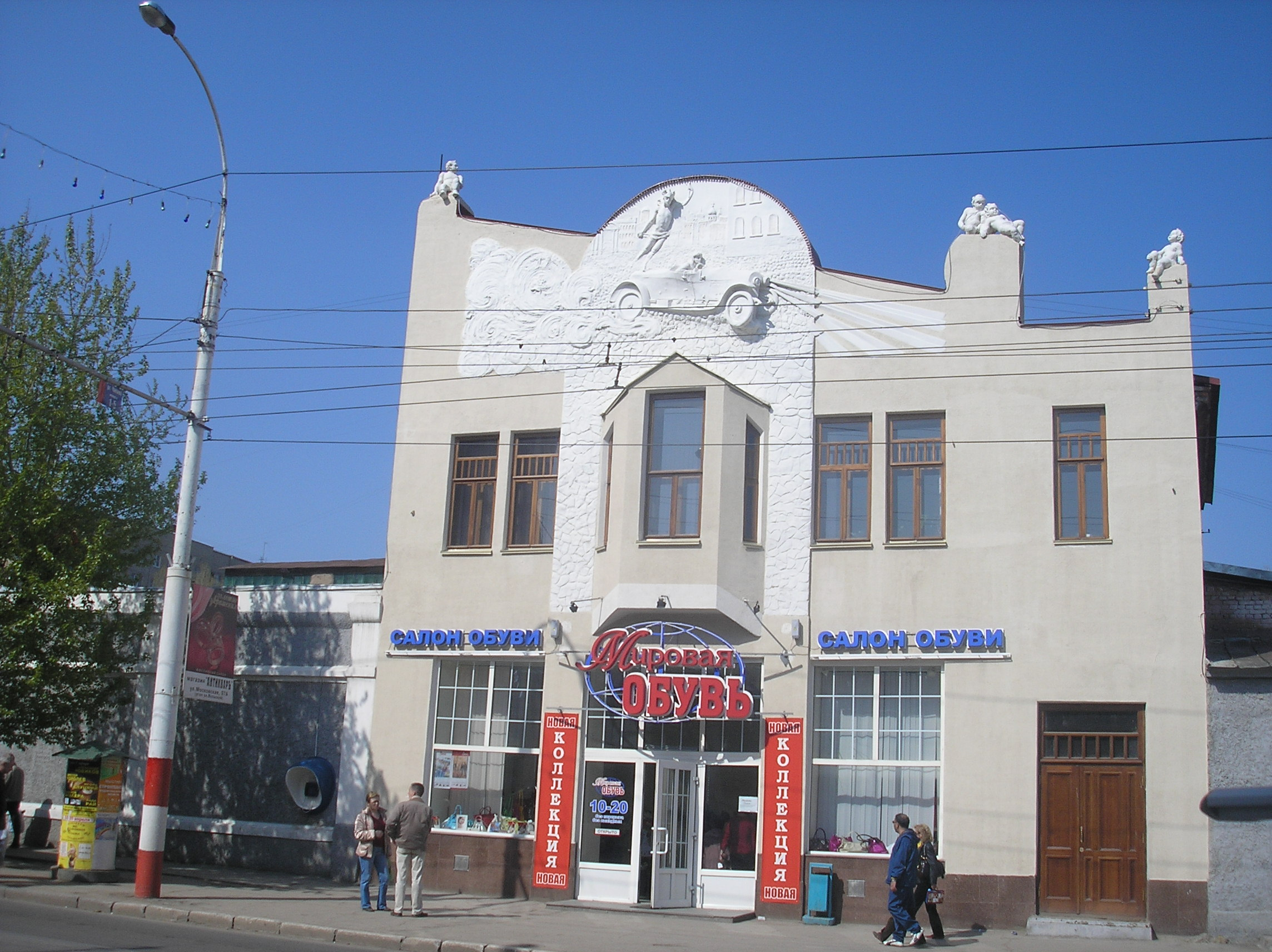
Saratov

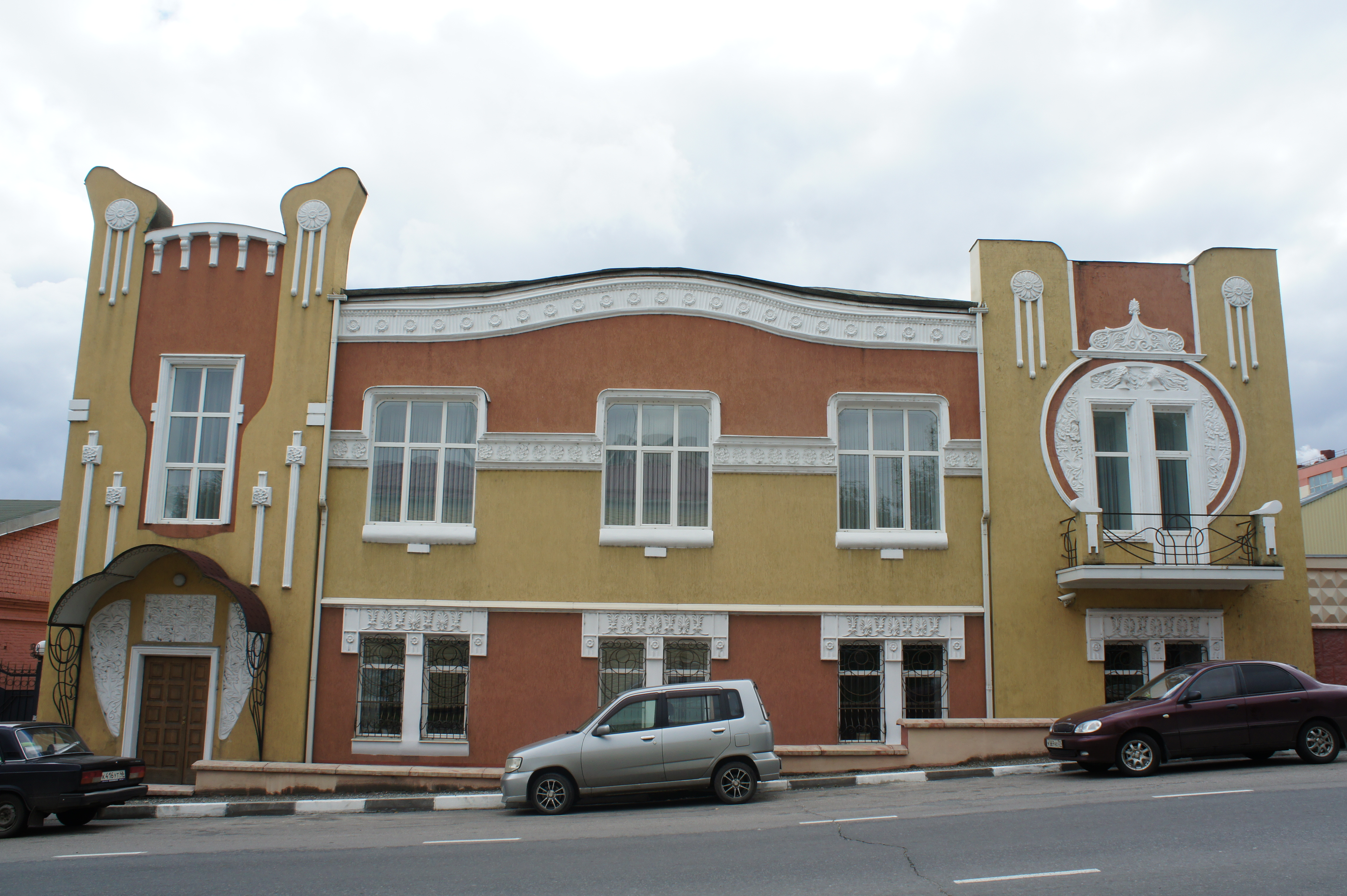
Stary Oskol

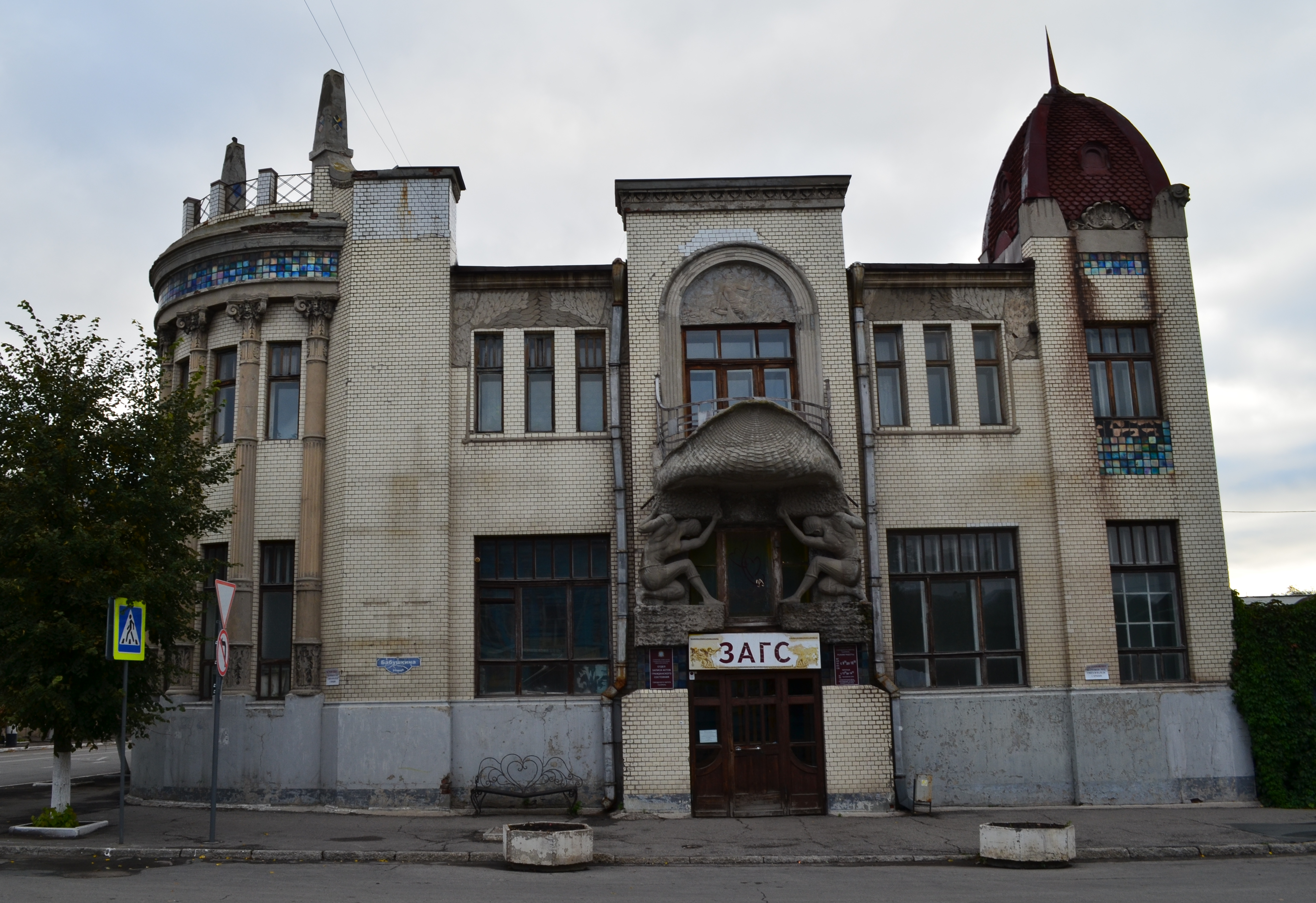
Syzran

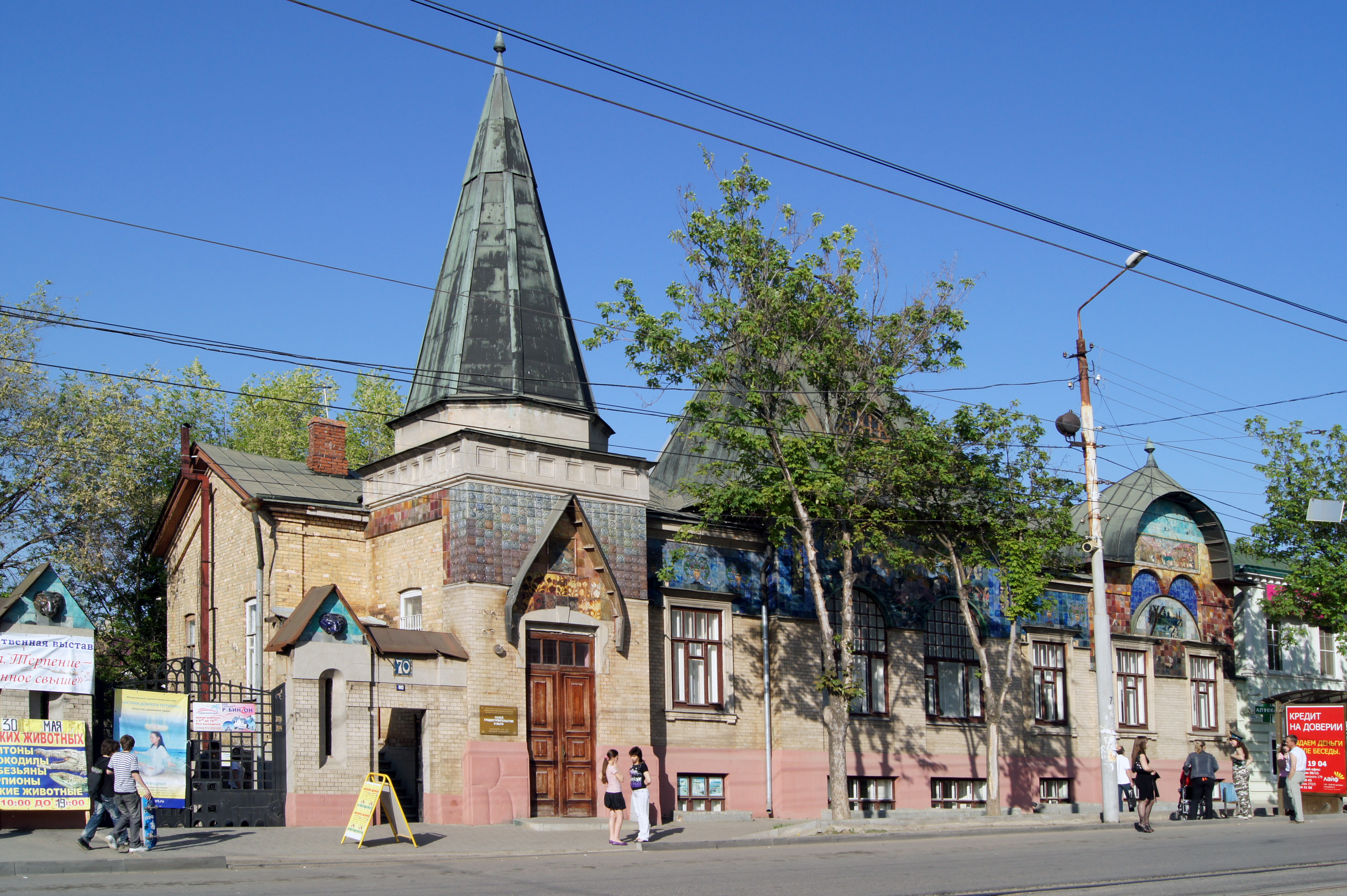
Taganrog

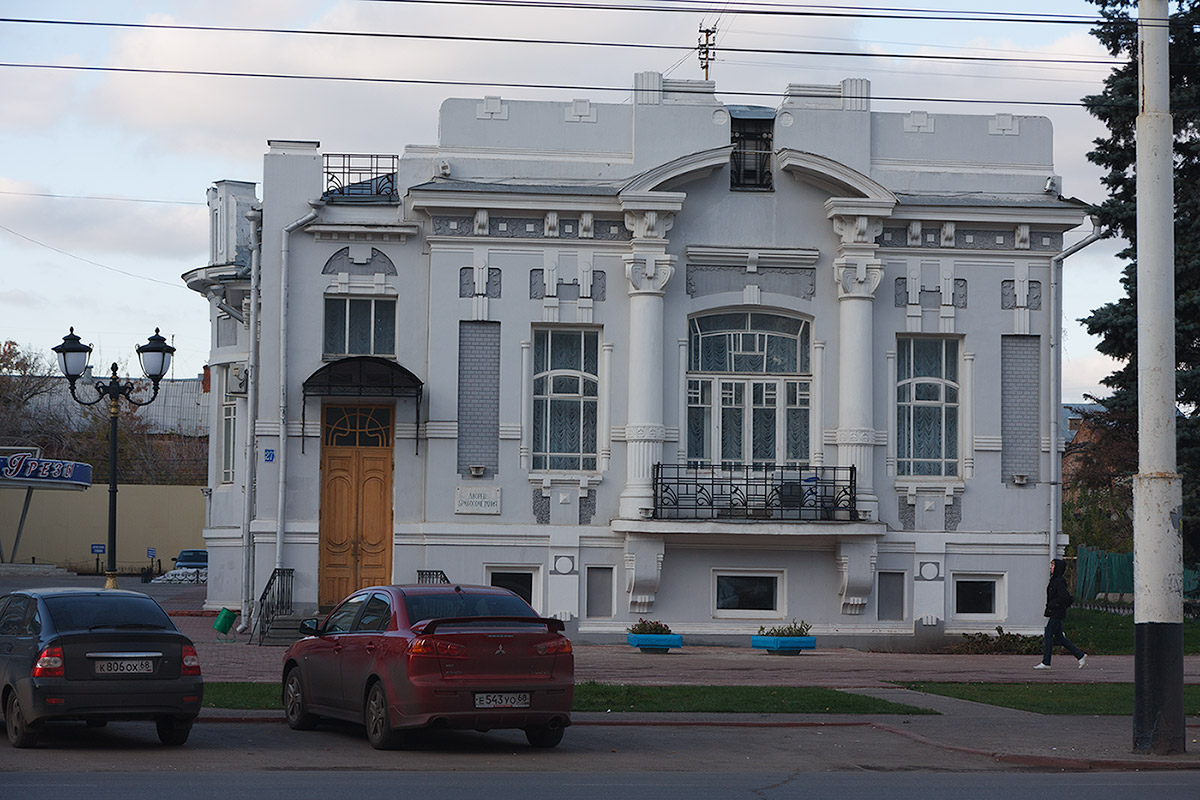
Tambov

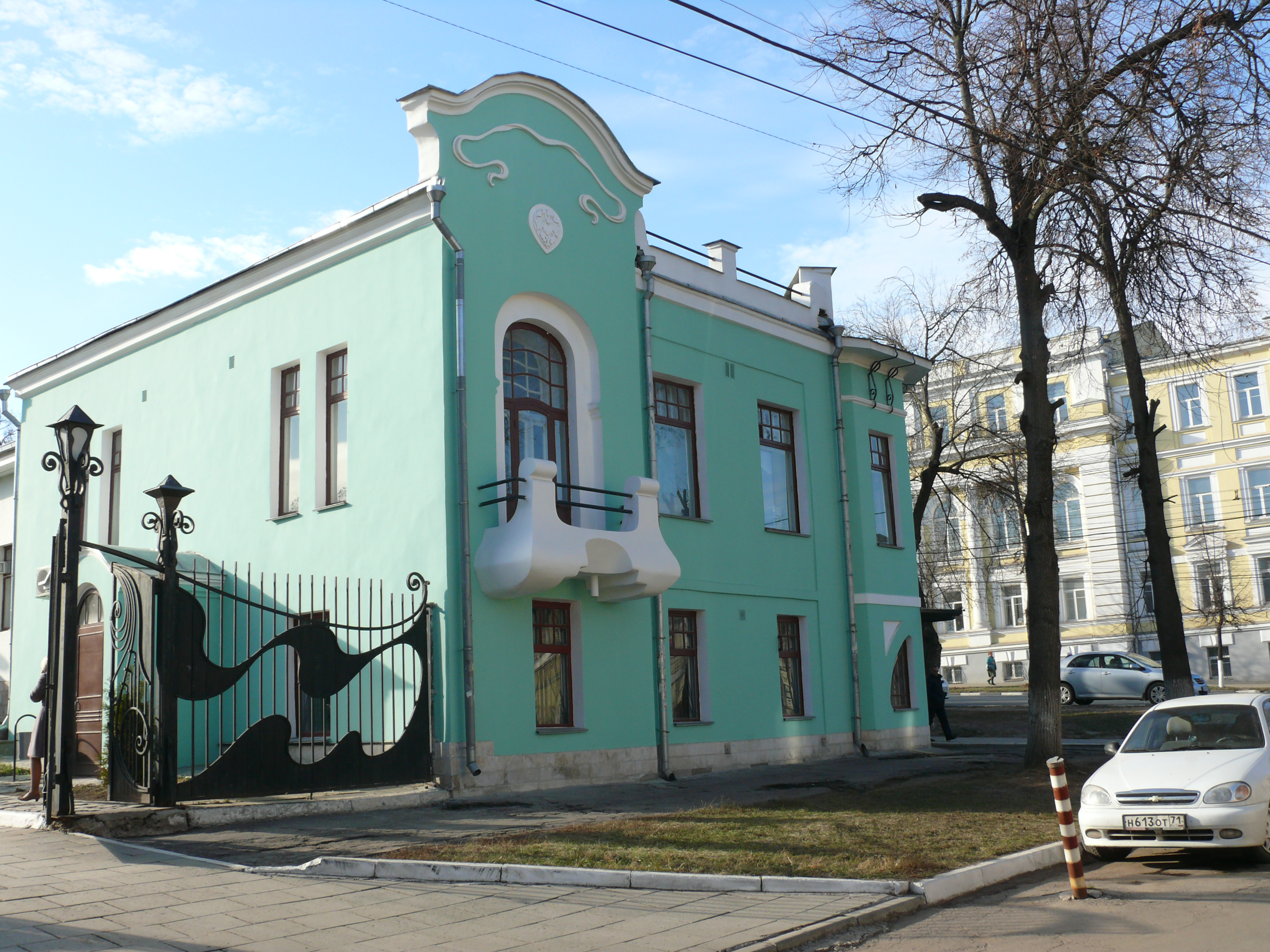
Tula

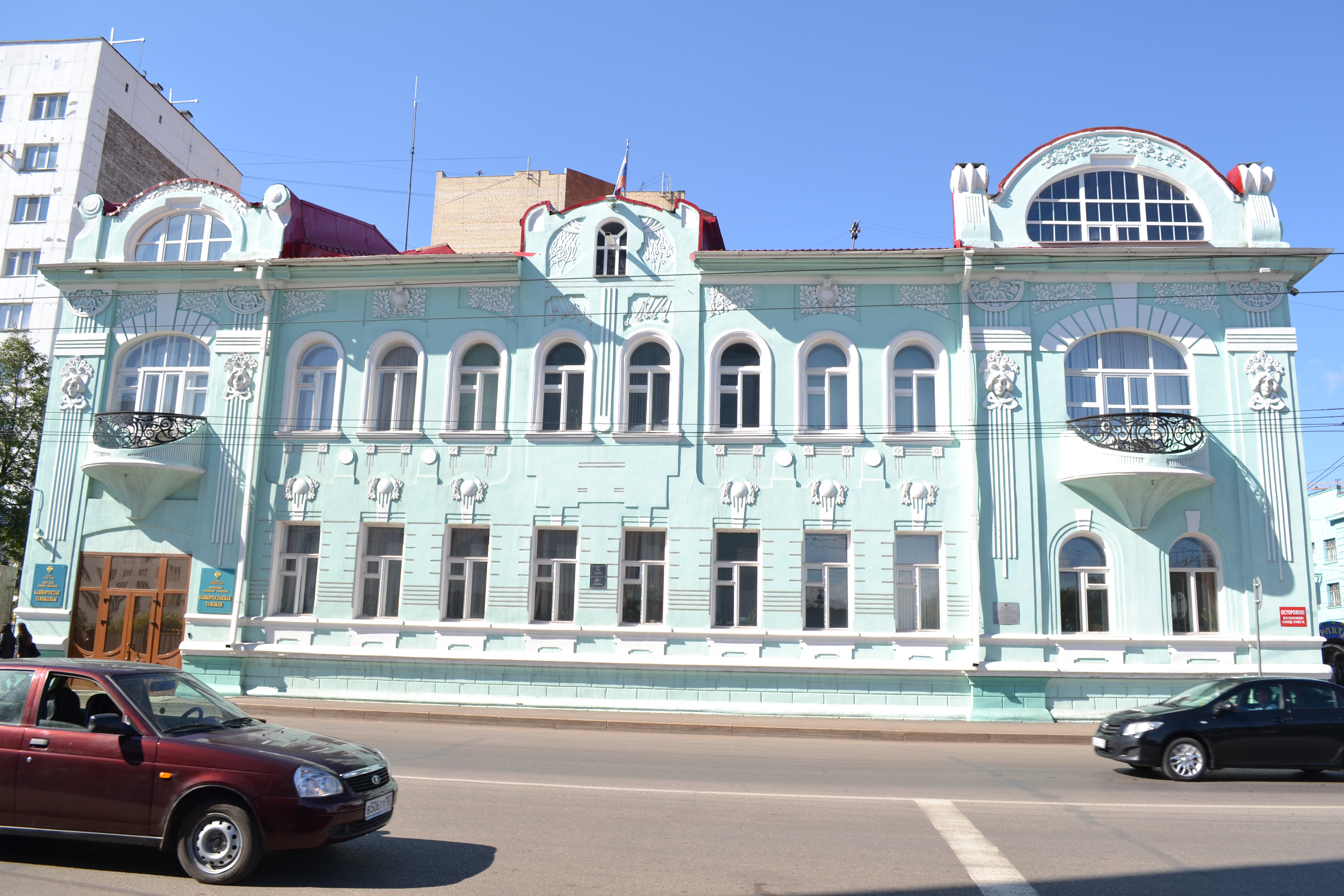
Ufa

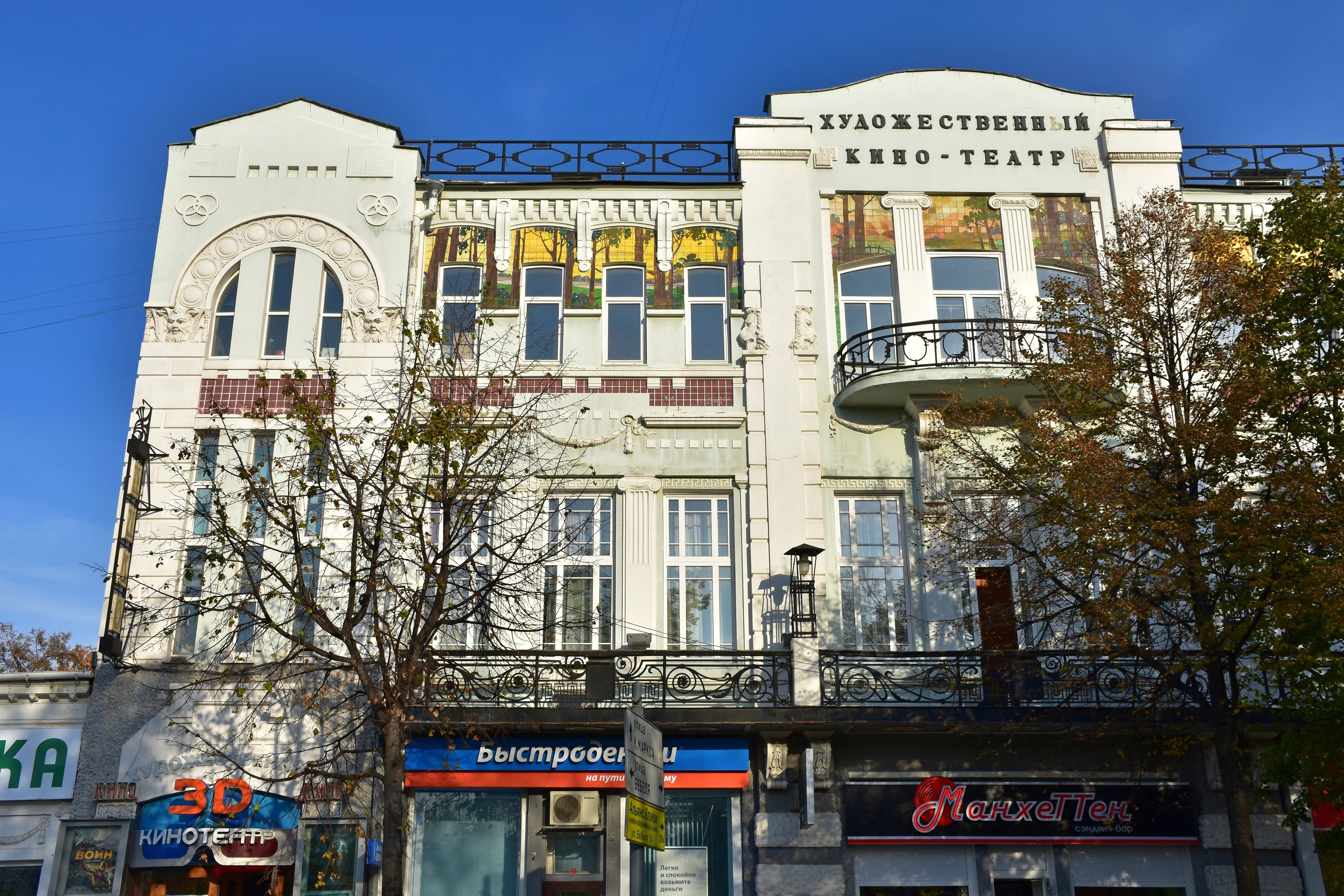
Ulyanovsk

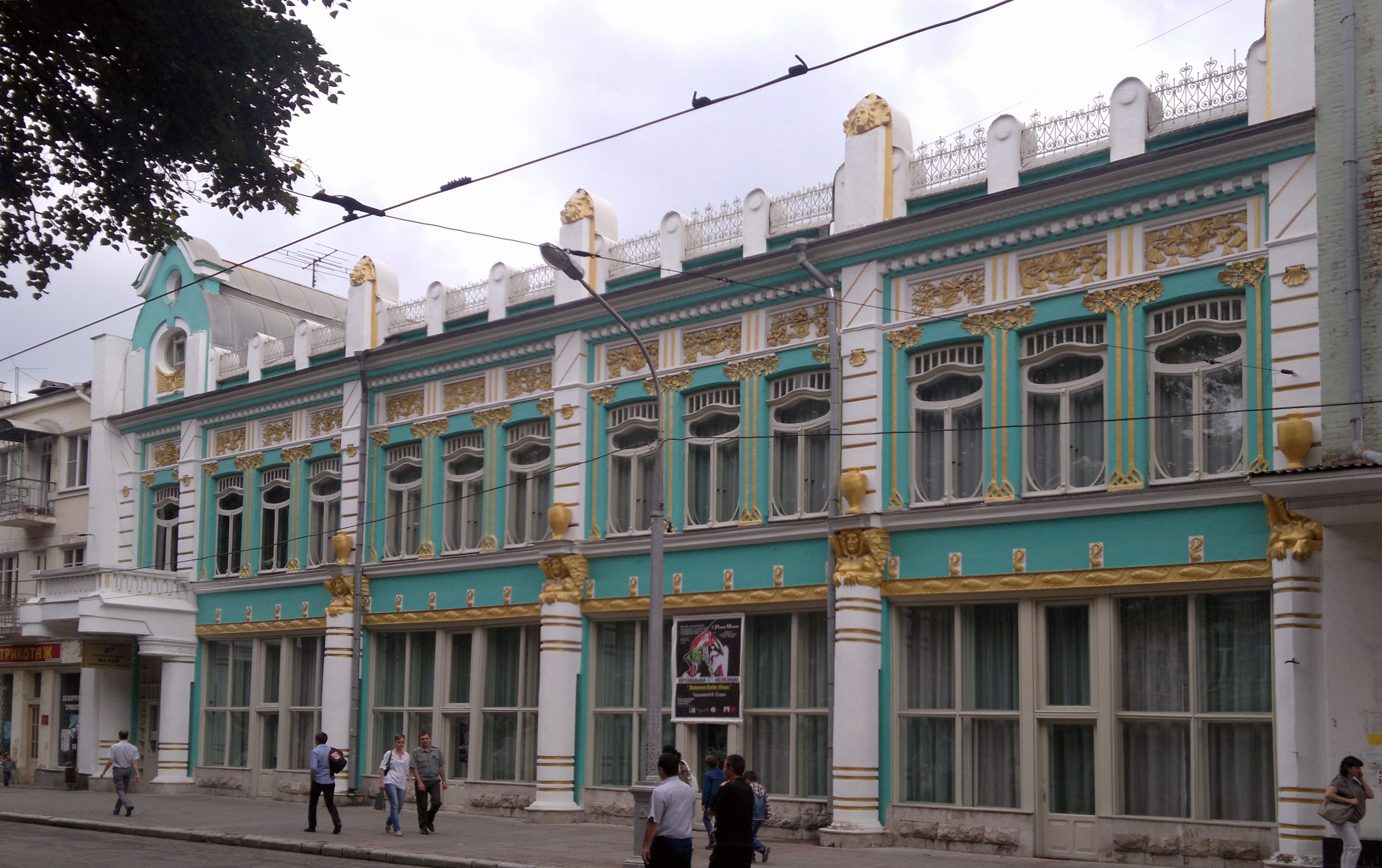
Vladikavkaz

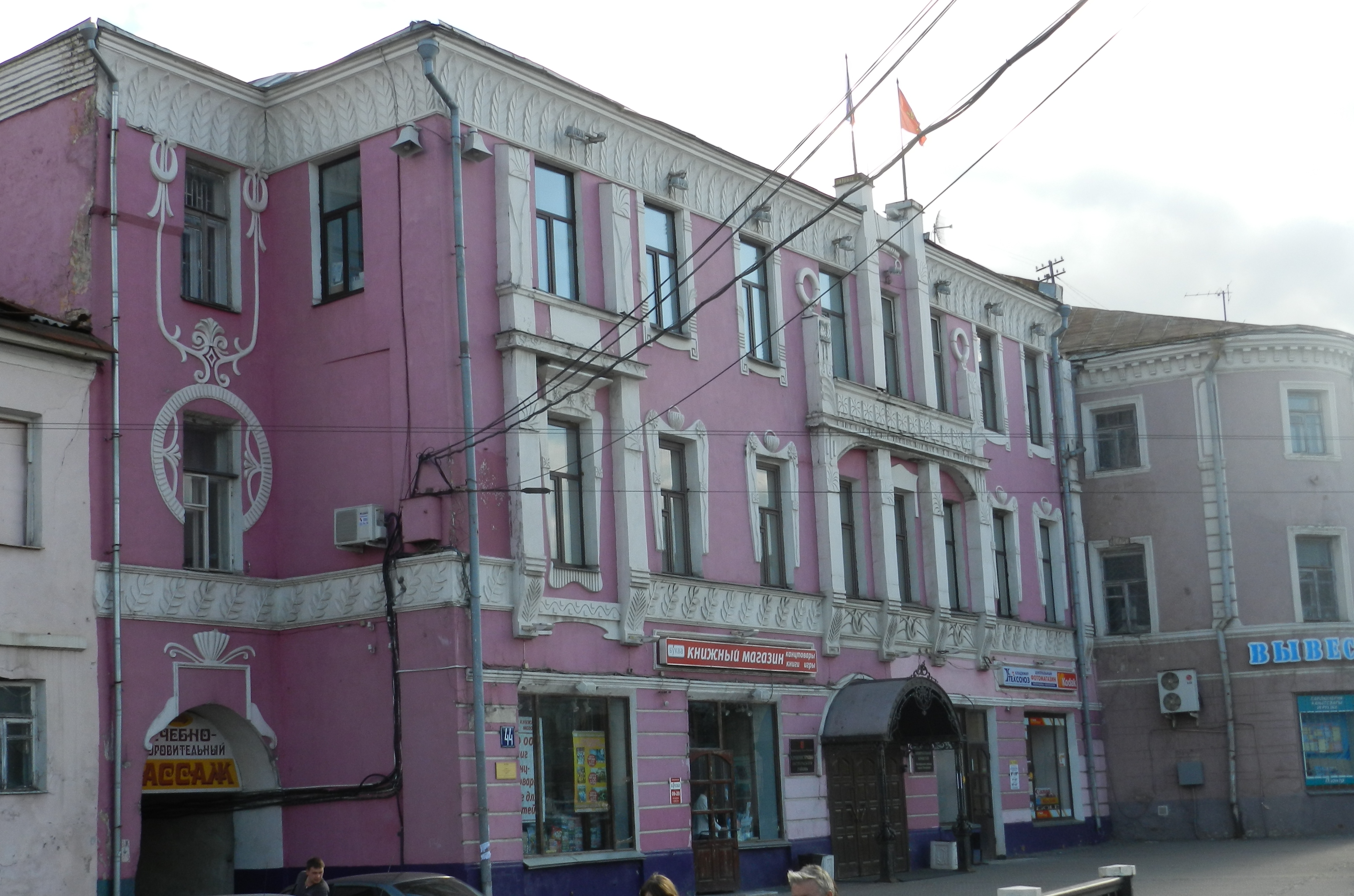
Vladimir

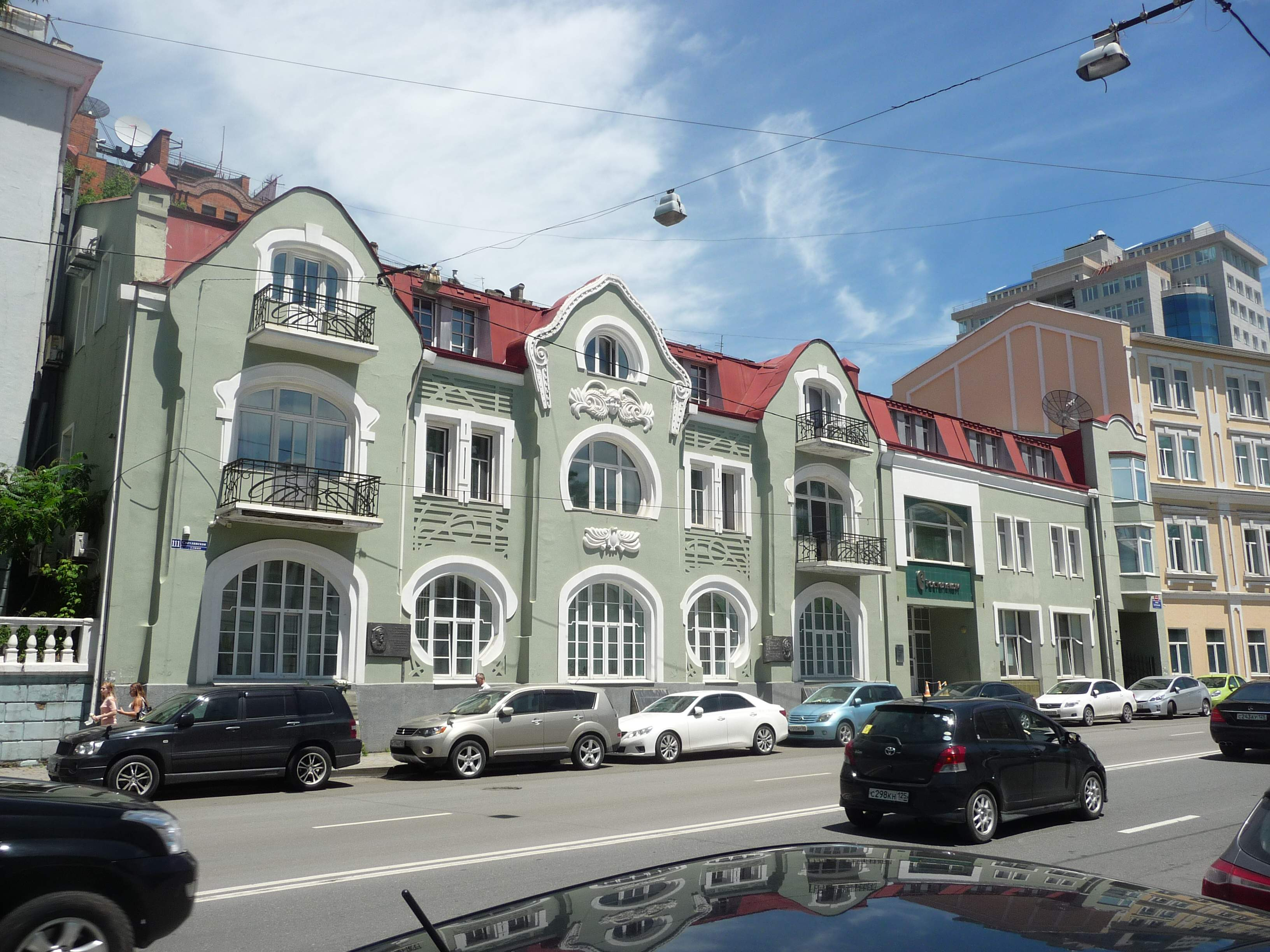
Vladivostok

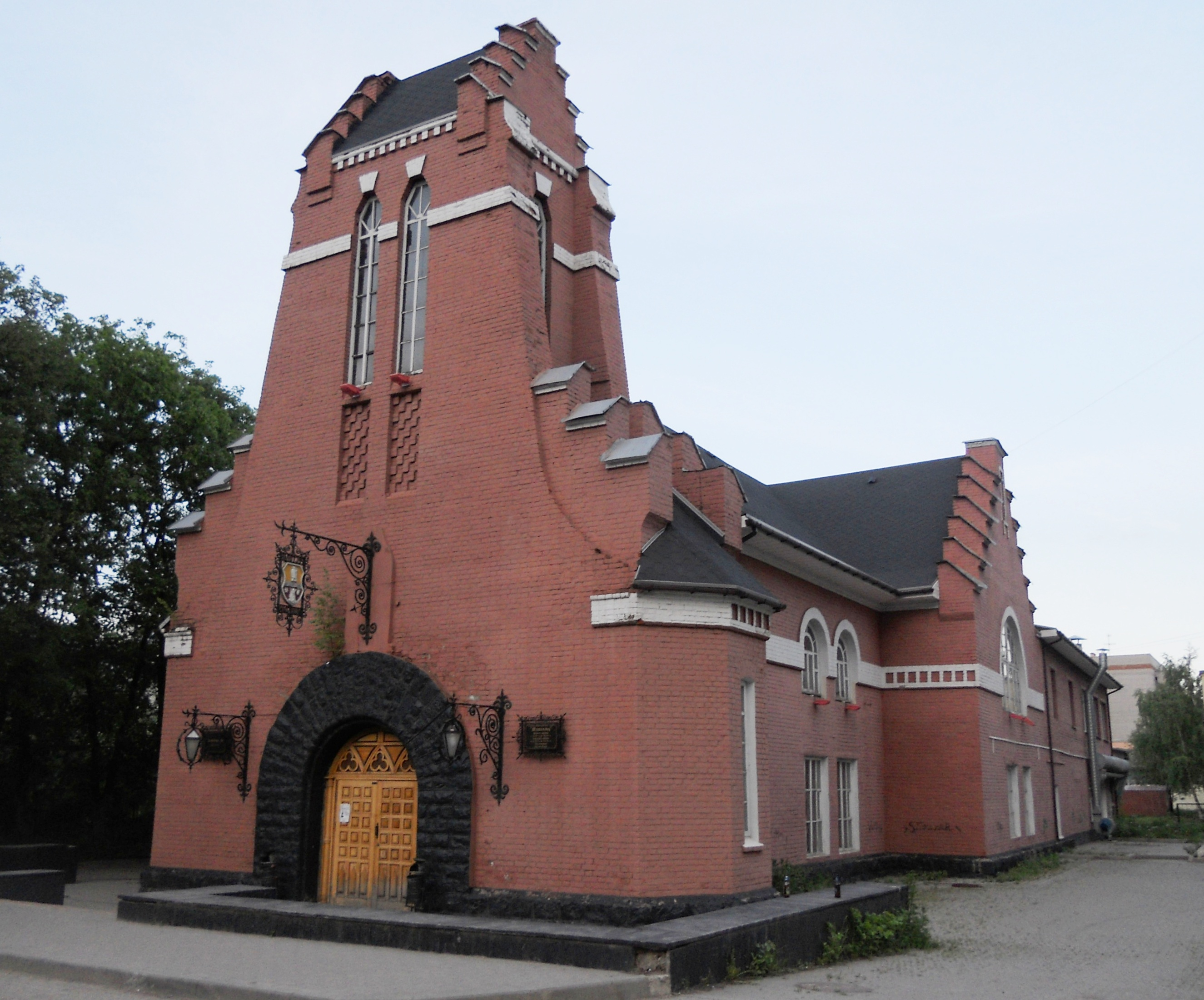
Vologda

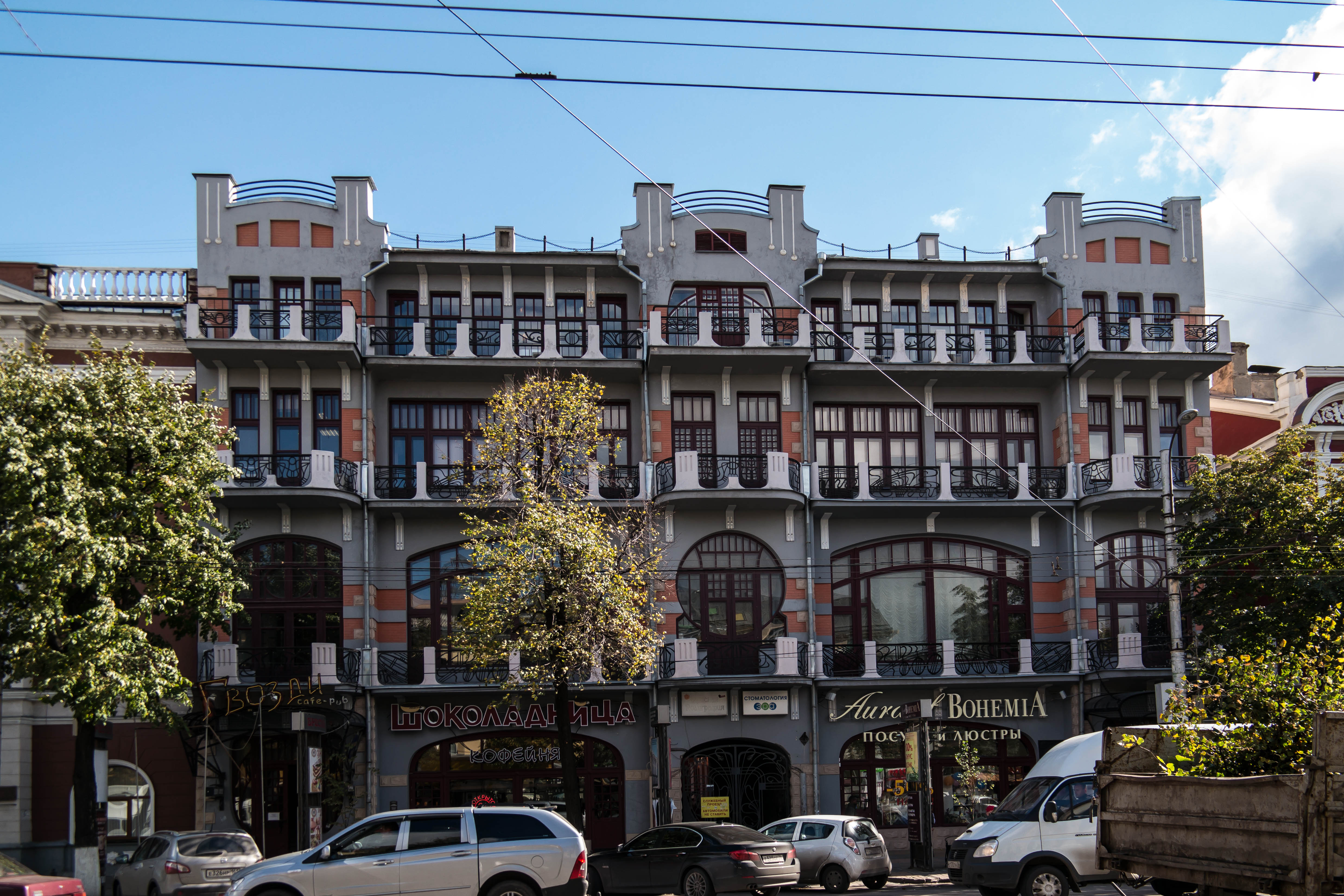
Voronezh

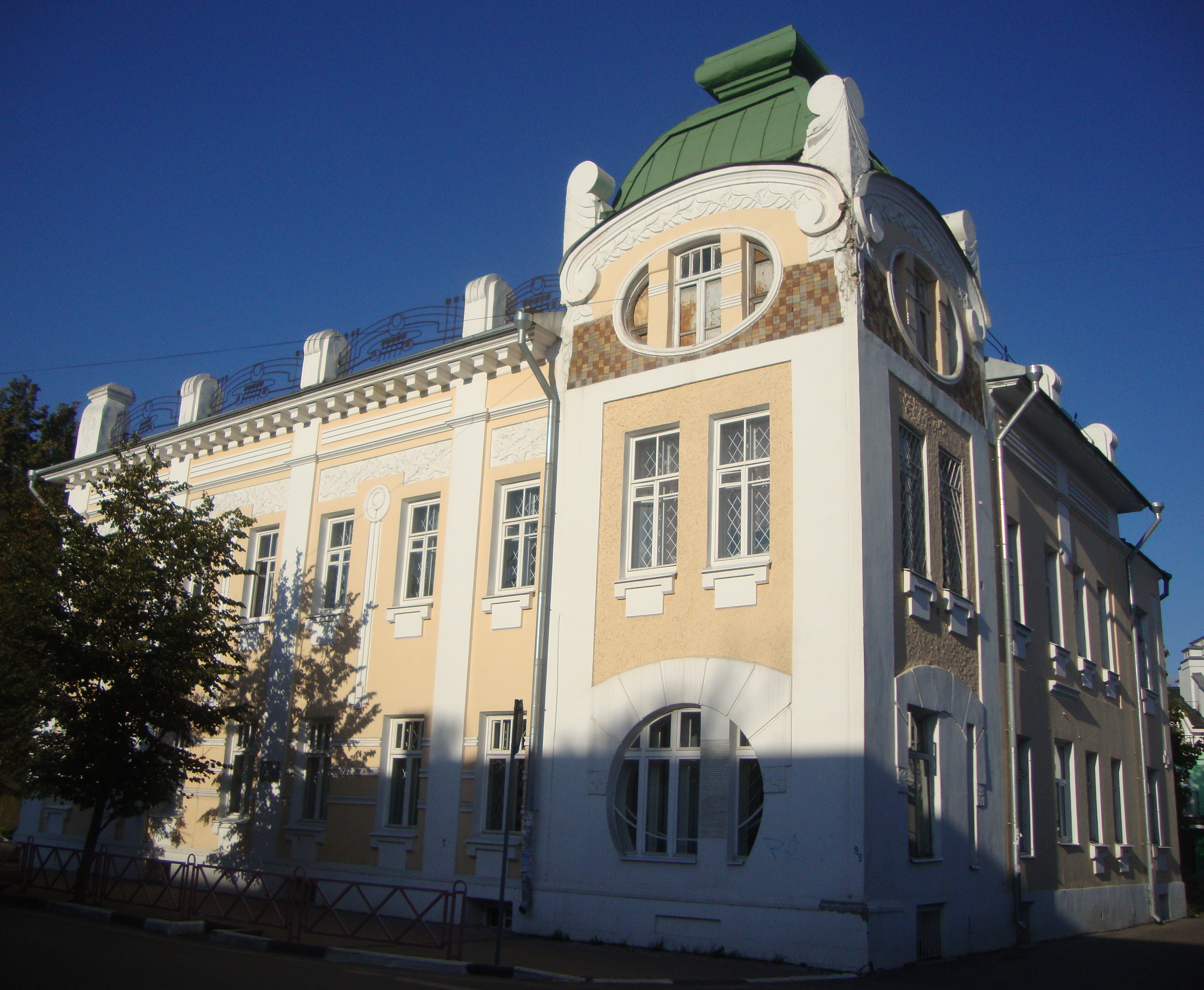
Yaroslavl

== See also ==
- Art Nouveau architecture in Riga
- Art Nouveau religious buildings

== Bibliography ==
- Fahr-Becker, Gabriele (2015). L'Art Nouveau (in French). H.F. Ullmann. ISBN 978-3-8480-0857-5.
- Makinson, Randall (1977). "Greene & Greene: Architecture as a Fine Art". Salt Lake City, Utah: Gibbs Smith. ISBN 0-87905-023-3.
- Taschen, Aurelia and Balthazar (2016). L'Architecture Moderne de A à Z (in French). Bibliotheca Universalis. ISBN 978-3-8365-5630-9.
