= Vasilyev =

Vasilyev, Vasiliev or Vassiliev or Vassiljev (Russian: Васильев), or Vasilyeva or Vasilieva (feminine; Russian: Васильева), is a common Russian surname that is derived from the Russian given name Vasiliy (equivalent of Basil) and literally means "Vasiliy's". It may refer to:

- Alexander Vasilyev (musician) (born 1969), lead singer and guitar player for the Russian rock band Splean
- Alexander Vasilyev (disambiguation), multiple people
- Alexander Vassiliev (born 1962), Russian journalist, writer and espionage historian
- Boris Vasilyev (disambiguation), multiple people
- Denys Vasilyev (born 1987), Ukrainian footballer
- Dimitry Vassiliev (born 1979), Russian ski jumper
- Dmitriy Vassiliev (born 1979), Russian ski jumper
- Dmitry Vasilyev (biathlete) (born 1962), Soviet biathlete and Olympic champion
- Dmitri Vasilyev (director) (1900–1984), Soviet film director
- Dmitry Vasilyev (herpetologist) (1963–2025), Russian herpetologist
- Dmitri Vasilyev (runner), Russian runner who participated in the 2000 Summer Olympics
- Dmitri Vasilyev (footballer, born 1977) (Dmitri Vladimirovich Vasilyev), Russian international footballer with FC Shinnik Yaroslavl and FC Rubin Kazan
- Dmitri Vasilyev (footballer, born 1985), Russian footballer with FC Shinnik Yaroslavl and FC Krylia Sovetov Samara
- Dmitri Vasilyev (footballer, born 2004), Russian footballer with FC Zenit Saint Petersburg
- Dmitri Dmitriyevich Vasilyev (1945–2003), leader of the Russian nationalistic Pamyat movement
- Feodosy Vasilyev (?–1711), Russian Old Believer and founder of the Fedoseevtsy movement
- Fyodor Vasilyev (1850–1873), Russian painter
- Georgi Vasilyev (1899–1946), Soviet film director and screenwriter
- Grigoriy Vasilyev, real name of Grigory Soroka (1823–1864), Russian painter
- Konstantin Vasilyev (1942–1976), Russian painter
- Konstantin Vassiljev (born 1984), Estonian footballer
- Leonid Vasiliev (1881–1966), Russian Soviet parapsychologist and physiologist
- Margarita Vasileva (born 2005), Bulgarian rhythmic gymnast
- Mikhail Vasilyev (explorer) (1770–1847), Russian seafarer and Vice Admiral
- Mikhail Vasilyev (handballer) (1961–2025), Russian handball player
- Nadezhda Vasilyeva (1915–1971), Russian imposter
- Nikolai Vasilyev (disambiguation), multiple people
- Olga Vasilyeva (disambiguation), multiple people
- Oleg Kimovich Vasilyev (born 1959), Russian Olympic and world pairs figure skating champion
- Oleg Vassiliev (1931–2013), Russian artist
- Sergei Vasilyev (1900–1959), Soviet film director
- Sergey Vasilyev (actor) (1827–1862), Russian stage actor
- Sofia Vassilieva (born 1992), Russian American actress
- Svetlana Vasilyeva (born 1983), Russian skeleton racer
- The Vasilyev brothers, the alias of Soviet film directors Georgi and Sergei Vasilyev, creators of the film Chapayev
- Uliana Vasilyeva (born 1995), Russian curler
- Vadim Vasilyev (businessman) (born 1965), vice president of the French football club AS Monaco FC
- Vadim Vasilyev (footballer) (born 1972), Azerbaijani footballer
- Valeri Vasiliev (1949–2012), Russian (Soviet) ice hockey player
- Vasily Vasilyev (1818–1900), Russian sinologist and academician
- Viktor Vasilyev (born 1959), Russian professional footballer
- Victor Anatolyevich Vassiliev (born 1956), Russian mathematician, known for the Vassiliev invariant in knot theory
- Viktor Konstantinovich Vasilyev (1887–1961), Russian and Soviet naval officer
- Vladimir Vasiliev (ballet dancer) (born 1940), Russian ballet dancer
- Vladimir Vasilyev (writer) (born 1967), Russian writer
- Yana Vassilyeva (born 1981), Kazakhstani handball player

== See also ==
- Vasilyevo
- Vasiļjevs
