= Merchant Bank Building (Kharkiv) =

- Будівля купецького банку та готелю «Асторія»
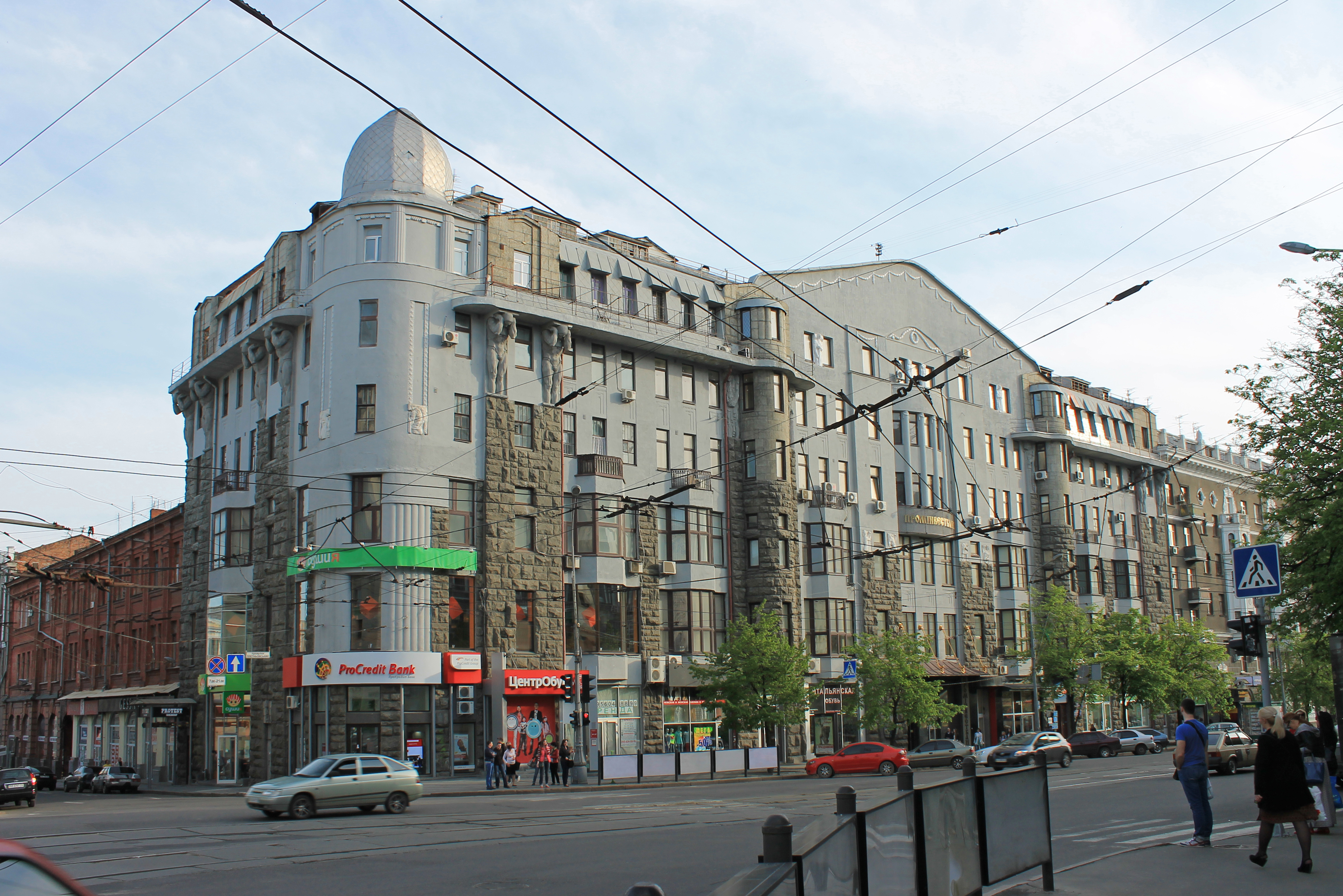
- Interactive map of Merchant Bank Building
- Location: Ukraine, Kharkiv, Pavlivskyi Square, 10
- Coordinates: 49°59′17″N 36°13′56″E
- Designer: Nikolai Vasyliev, Oleksandr Rzhepishevskyi
- Builder: Oleksandr Rzhepishevskyi
- Type: bank, office and hotel
- Material: reinforced concrete, brick
- Height: 6 floors
- Beginning date: 1910
- Completion date: 1913
- Restored date: 1950s
- Heritage status: Monument of architecture and urban planning of local significance of Ukraine No. 7278-Ха

The Building of the Merchant Bank (Ukrainian: Будівля купецького банку, romanized: Budivlia kupetskoho banku, Ukrainian: Асторія "Astoria" or Ukrainian: Мелодія "Melody") is a historical building in the city center of Kharkiv, located on Pavlivskyi Square, 10. It is a monument of architecture and urban planning of local significance No. 7278-Ха.

== History ==
The idea of building a new building arose in the Kharkiv Merchant Society in 1909, when an architectural competition was held in St. Petersburg. The project of Russian architect Leonid Sologub won it. However, the Society chose the project of the young Ukrainian architect Oleksandr Rzhepishevskyi and the architect from St. Petersburg Nikolai Vasyliev as its winner. Sculptures were made by sculptors V. V. Kozlov and L. A. Dietrich. The building of the Merchant Bank was built in 1910–1913, it has six floors: the first three were occupied by the bank itself and office premises, the upper three were occupied by one of the most elite hotels in the city - "Astoria". The name of the hotel arose at the beginning of the 20th century as a response to hotels of a fashionable style in New York, owned by the Astor brothers.

The building is made in the Northern Modern style, decorated with large Atlases, bizarre mascarons and other stucco. The building has a monolithic reinforced concrete frame, which was erected by the Black Sea Insurance Society. Inside, the bank and the hotel were stylishly decorated, two elevators worked. To supervise the construction, architect Rzhepishevsky moved to Kharkiv, where he will create a number of buildings in the National Romantic style (Northern Modern), in particular cooperative houses No. 6 (known as the "House with Fountains") and No. 19 Rymarska Street, where he himself will live.

At the beginning of the Soviet-German war, the building was burned down, and later damaged by shelling. After the Second World War, it was restored according to the project of architect Petro Shpara. In Soviet times, the building became known as "Melody" - after the name of a large music store, which was located on the first floor of the building from 1951 to 2011.

== Gallery ==
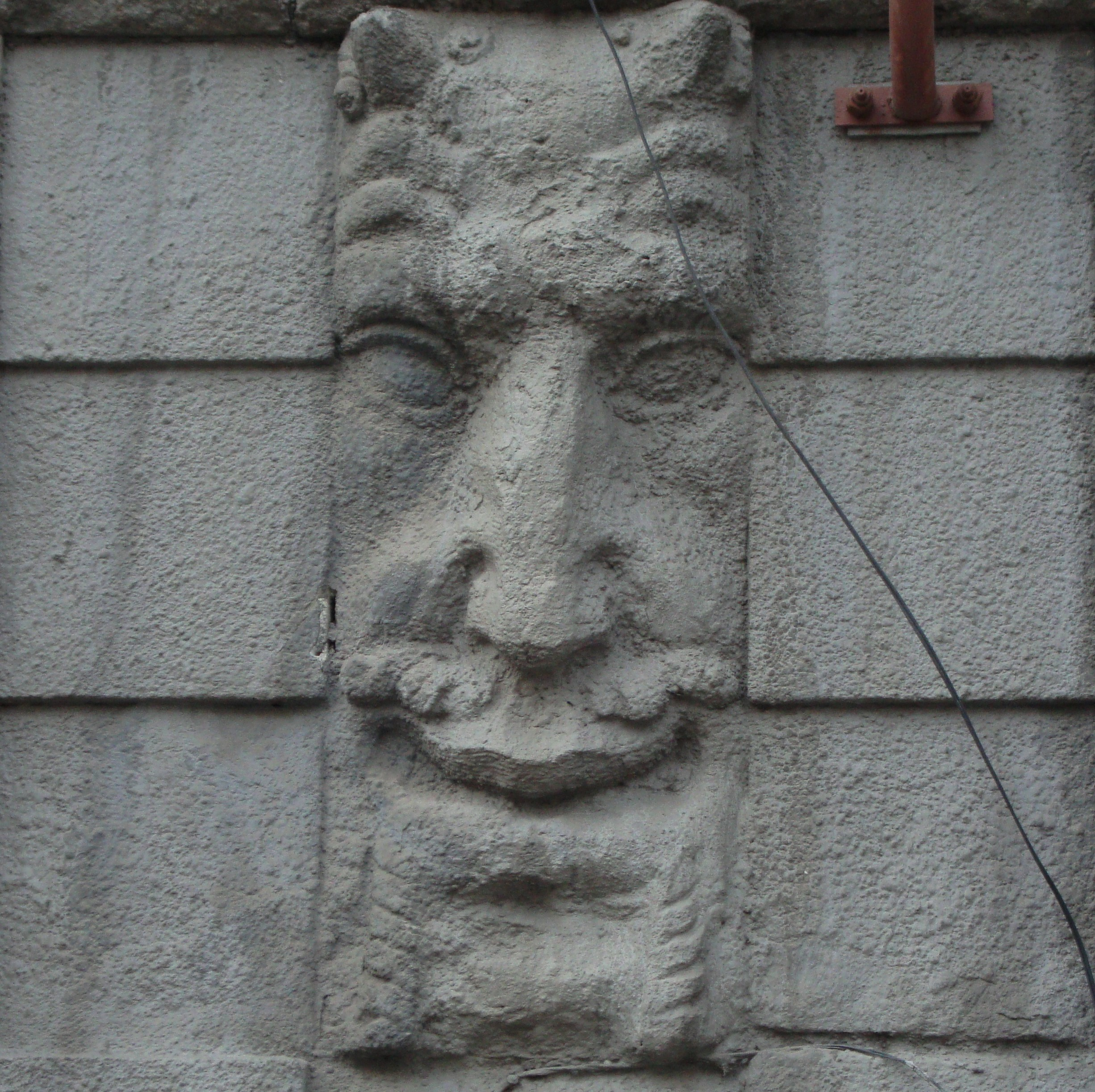
Fancy mascaron

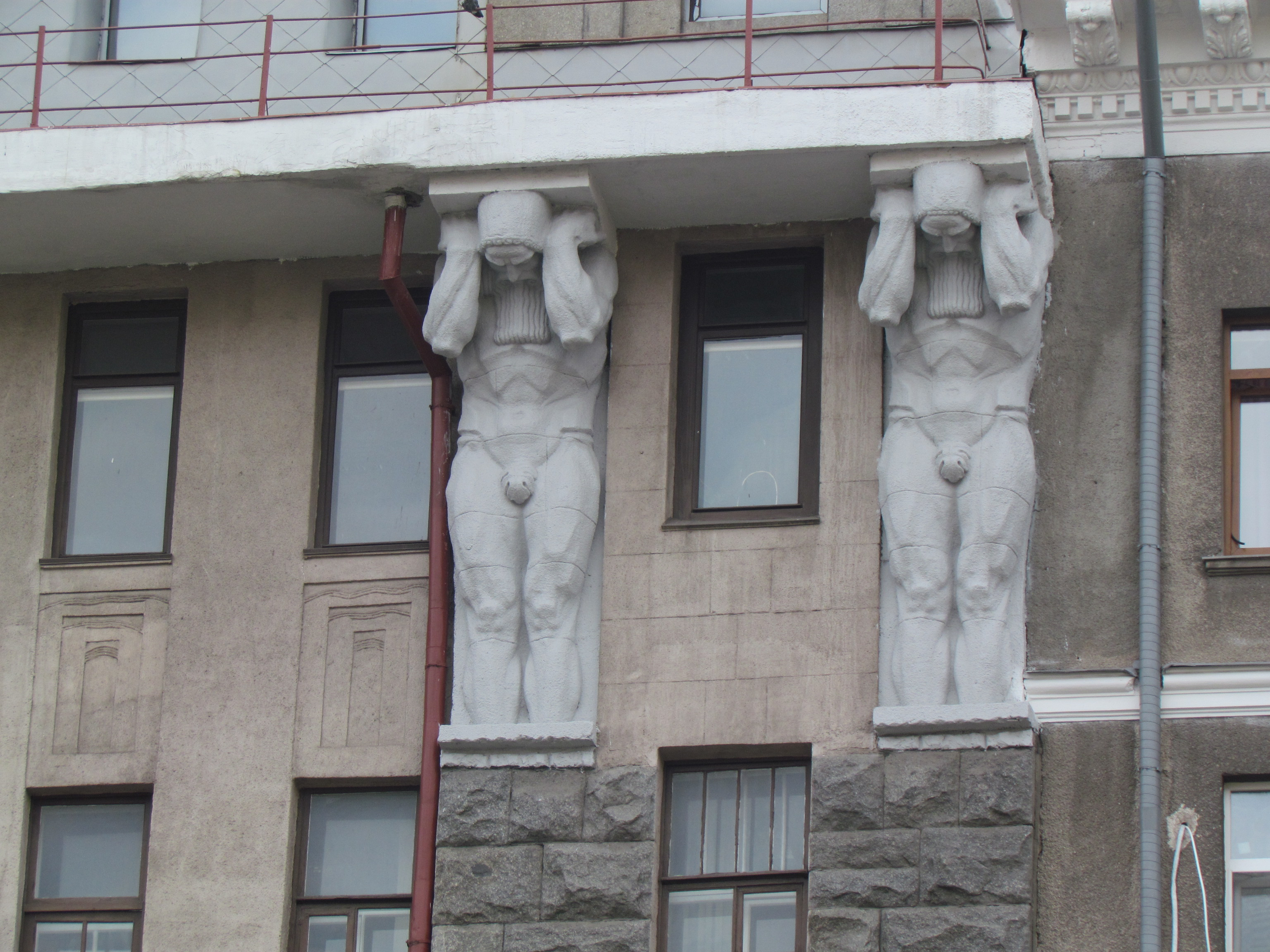
Atlas

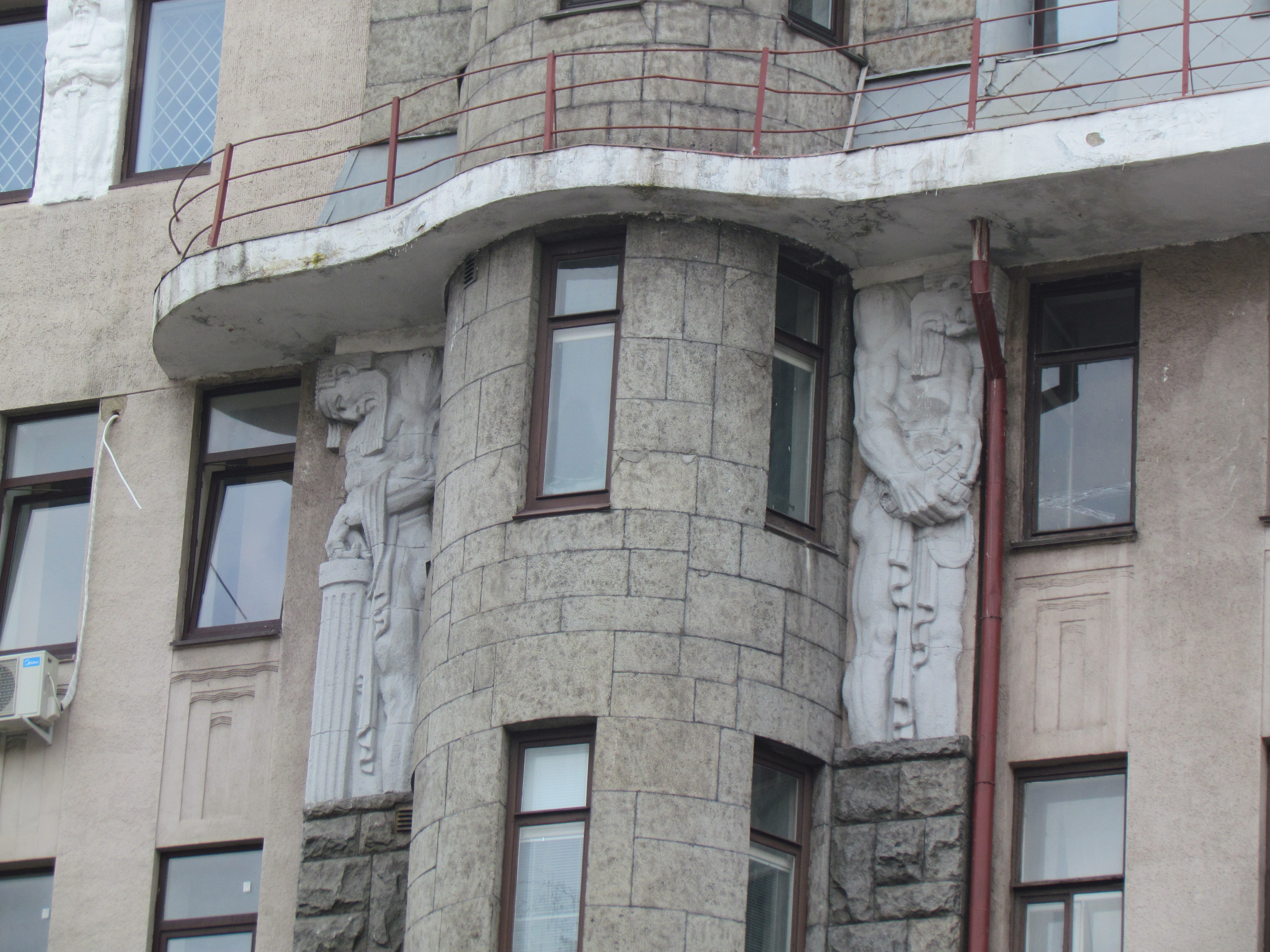
Flat Atlases

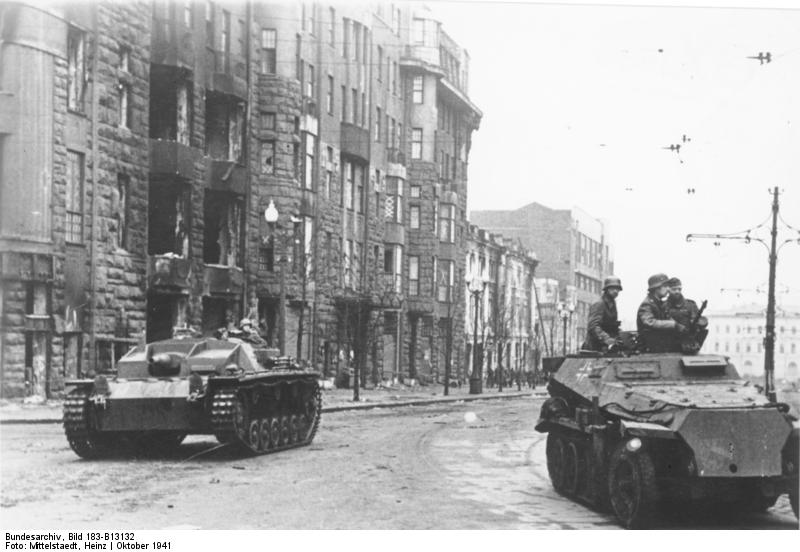
Building during World War II

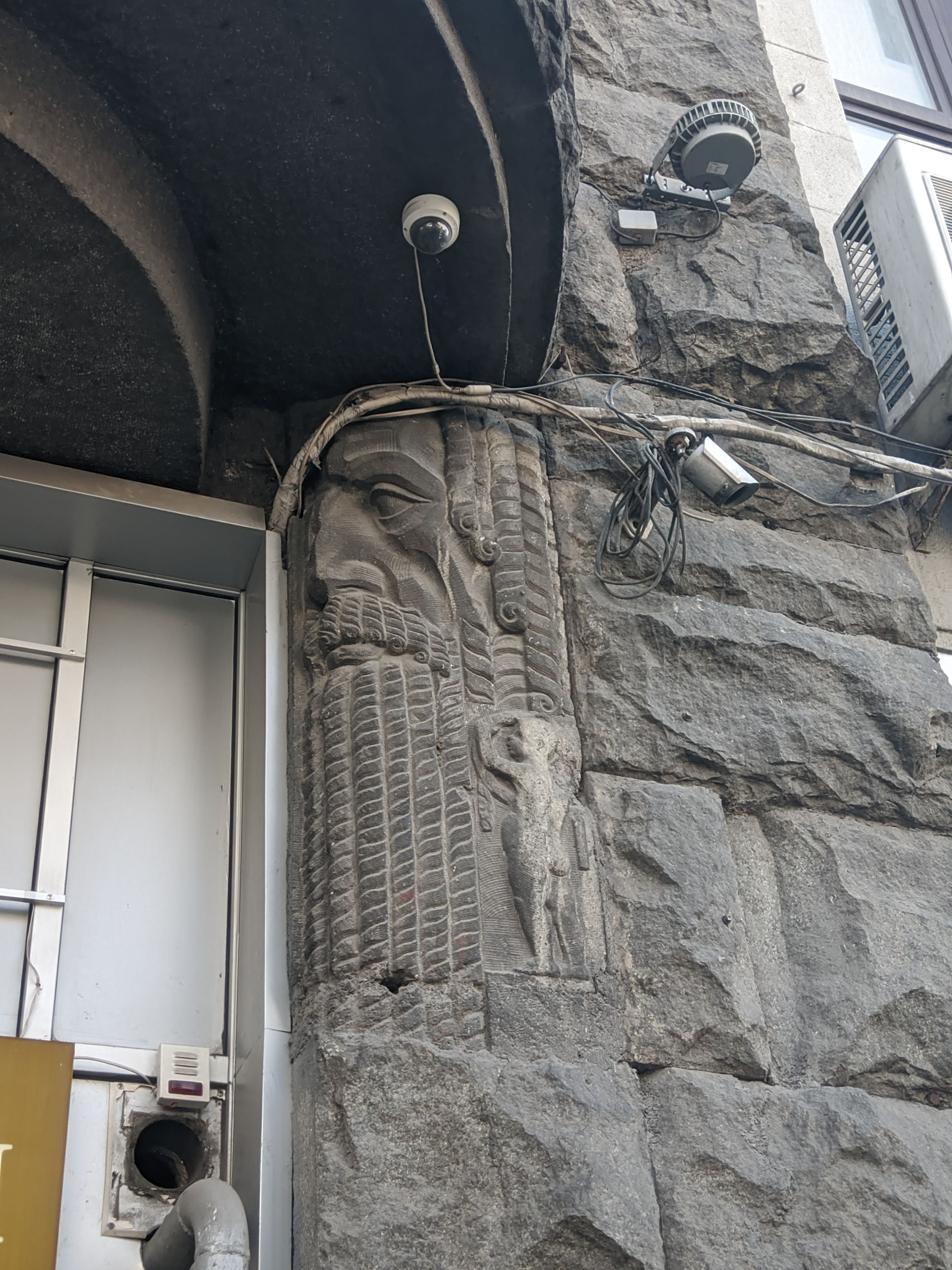
Fancy mascaron

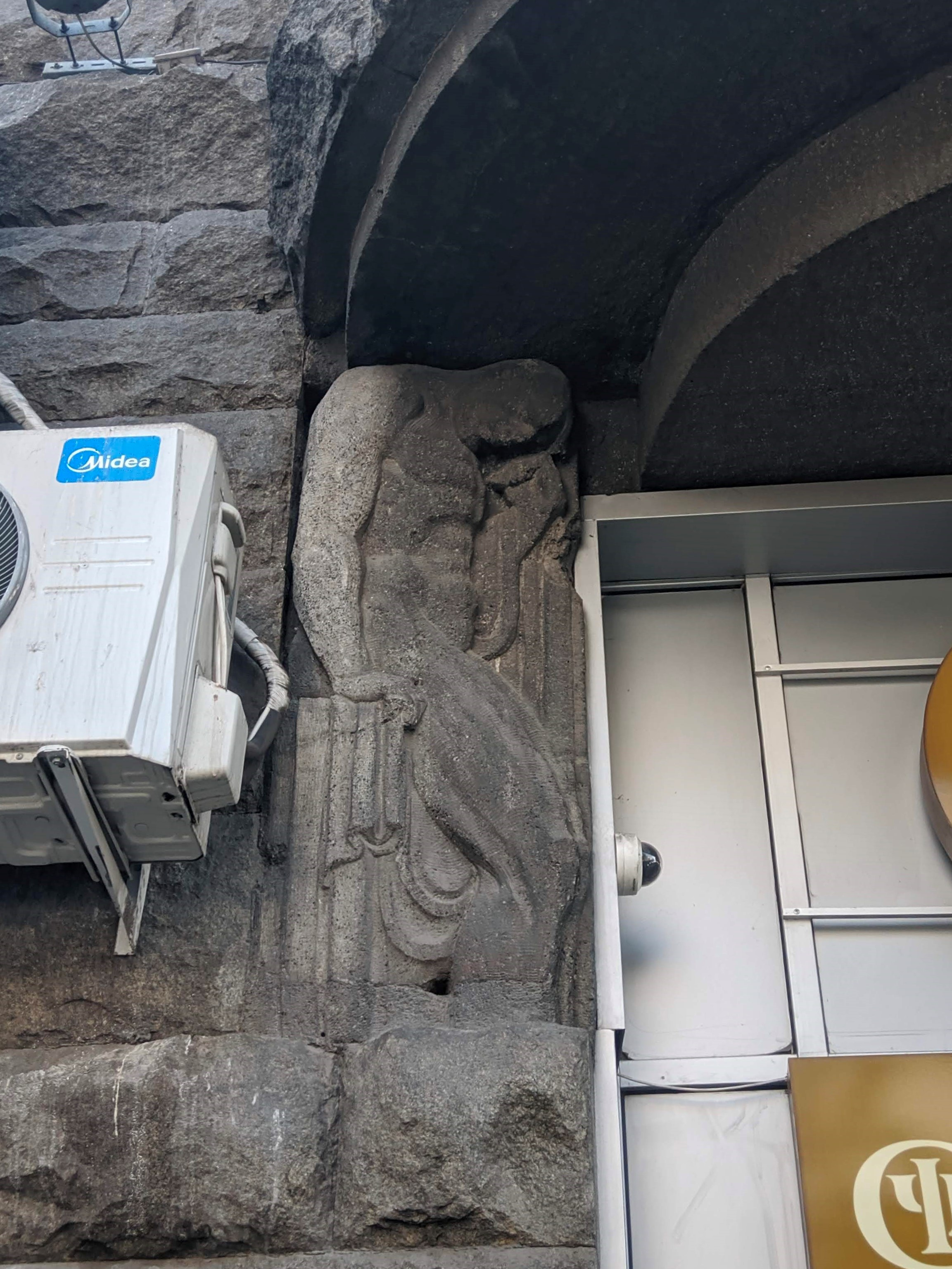
Stucco molding near the entrance

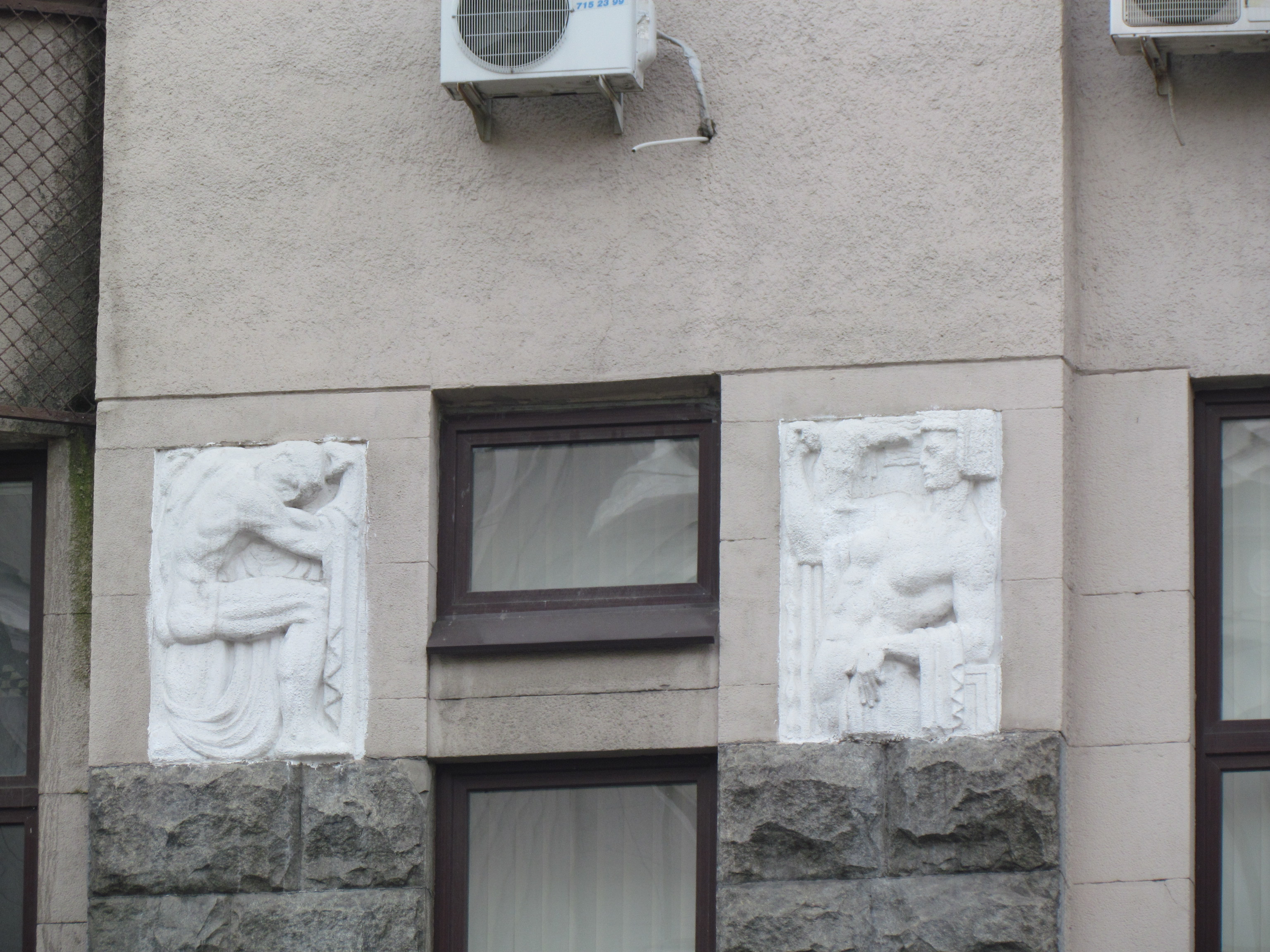
Stucco

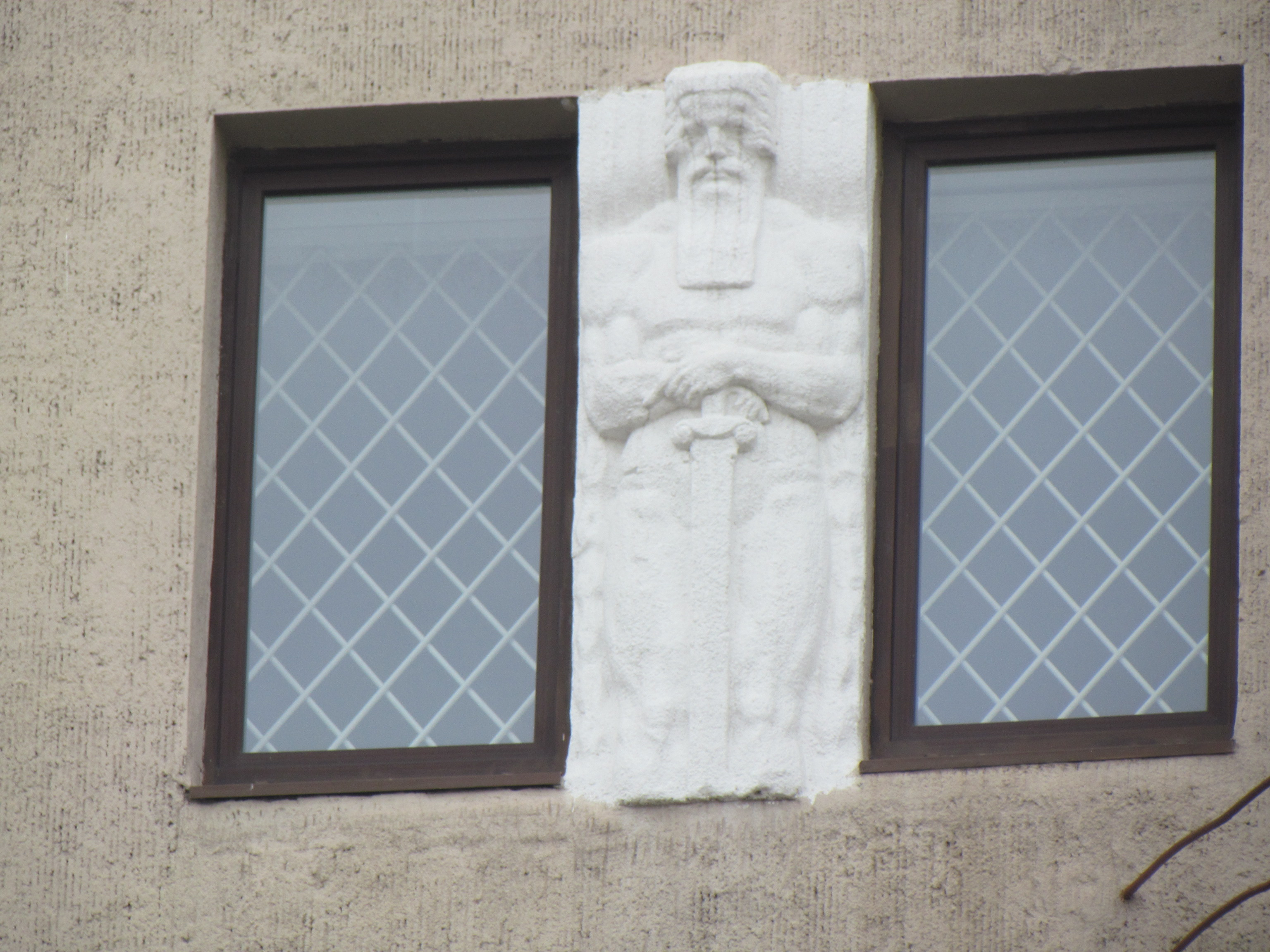
Stucco molding with knightly motifs

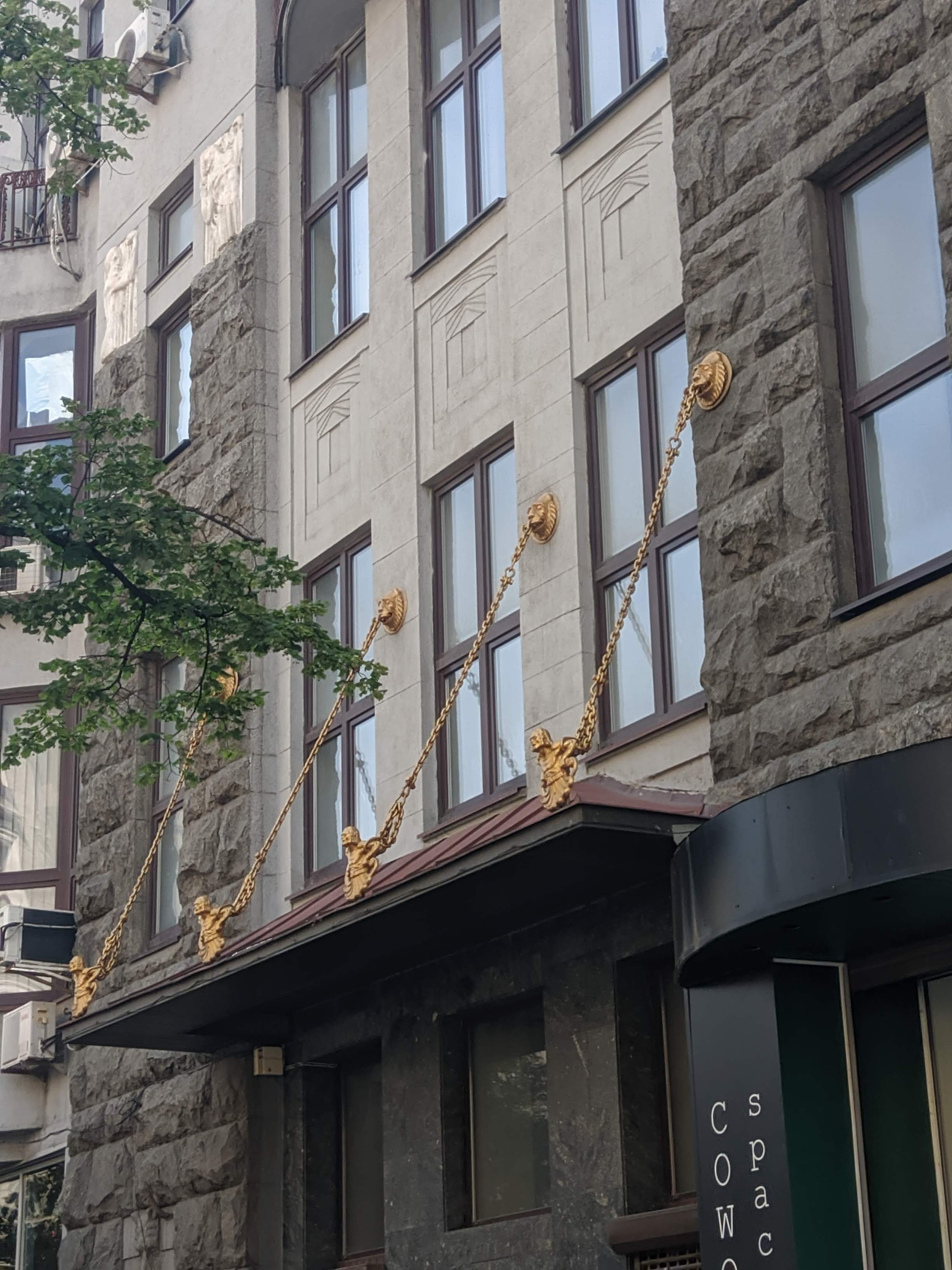
Small wrought iron sculptures supporting the canopy over the entrance

== See also ==
- Oleksandr Rzhepishevskyi
- Nikolai Vasilyevich Vasilyev

== Sources ==
- Kharkiv region: encyclopedic dictionary. / Kharkiv region. council. Kharkiv. Golden pages, 2014. — 440 p.
- Directory "All Kharkiv", 1913.
- Former Merchant Bank and Astoria Hotel
- Merchant Bank and Astoria Hotel — Kharkiv Map
