= Oleksandr Rzhepishevskyi =

Polish-Ukrainian architect

Oleksandr Ivanovych Rzhepishevsky
- Born: Ржепішевський Олександр Іванович; 1879; Izmail, Bessarabia Governorate
- Died: 1930 (aged 50–51); Moscow, Soviet Union
- Education: Akkerman Men's Gymnasium, 4th Odessa Gymnasium; Odesa University; Institute of Civil Engineers; Sorbonne University
- Occupation: Architect
- Spouse: Anna Alchevska
- Awards: Honored Artist of Ukraine
- Practice: architect, restorer, university lecturer

Oleksandr Ivanovych Rzhepishevsky (Ukrainian: Ржепішевський Олександр Іванович, 1879, Izmail, Bessarabia Governorate — 1930, Moscow, USSR) was a Ukrainian architect of Polish origin of the Art Nouveau (Modern) era, who worked mainly in the city of Kharkiv.

== Biography ==
Born in 1879 in Izmail, Bessarabia Governorate, in a family of an officer. In 1882, he moved with his parents to Akkerman, Odesa Governorate.

He studied at the Akkerman Men's Gymnasium, then at the 4th Odessa Gymnasium, and then, following his older brothers, entered the Faculty of Physics and Mathematics of Novorossiya University (Odesa). Deciding to become an architect, he went to St. Petersburg, where in 1903 he graduated from the St. Petersburg Institute of Civil Engineers with a gold medal. He received the right to continue his studies abroad. He went to Paris, where he studied at the Sorbonne in 1904–1906.

He returned to the Russian Empire and got married. He could not count on the help of his parents' family, as it was large. Joining forces with an old friend, architect Nikolai Vasyliev, he began participating in architectural competitions held in St. Petersburg. The project of a new merchant bank by the two architects was liked and accepted for implementation by the guild of merchants of the city of Kharkiv. Rzhepishevsky was invited to Kharkiv to supervise the implementation of the bank project.

He worked in Kharkiv in 1910–1920, where he created a number of buildings that are now architectural monuments. One of the architect's last buildings is the "Dolosy" sanatorium, Yalta, Crimea.

Rzhepishevsky was one of the initiators of the creation in the Russian Empire of the "Society of Private Apartments", which can be considered a prototype of modern construction cooperatives. Apartments in such houses were owned by residents, each owner could choose individual decoration and layout. One of the first such houses was built according to his project at 6 Rymarska Street in 1912. It became known as the "House with Fountains", because the architect placed several fountains in the entrance, some of which are still working (until the Russian invasion in 2022). The owners of the apartments were people of "liberal professions": lawyers, doctors, architects. Oleksandr Ivanovych himself lived in this house, as well as architect Viktor Abramovych Estrovych. The apartments consisted of 4–6 rooms, had a reception room and an office. In 1914, after the construction of another company house, but with larger rooms (up to 50 square meters), the architect and his family moved to 19 Rymarska Street, where he and his family occupied two apartments.

After the beginning of the Soviet occupation of Ukraine, he lost all his property and means of subsistence, from his two apartments the Soviet authorities left him only one room. He decided to move with his family to Crimea to emigrate after his friend Nikolai Vasyliev. But while there, he met his second wife and decided to stay. Later he moved to Moscow, where he lived in poverty and obscurity on Herzen Street (now Bolshaya Nikitskaya Street).

His brother Mykhailo Ivanovych Rzhepishevsky lived in Odesa on Koblevska Street (now Pavlo Zeleny Street), 36 and in 1916 was a member of OVIRTT.

He was married twice. He is the father of one of the first Soviet film stars Natalia Glann and the famous Soviet choreographer Halyna Shakhovska.

As a "bourgeois element", he was arrested in 1930 and spent six months in prison. After his release from prison, he was ill and died two months after his release from a heart attack. The burial place is unknown.

In 2014, a street in Kharkiv was named in honor of Oleksandr Rzhepishevsky.

== Works ==
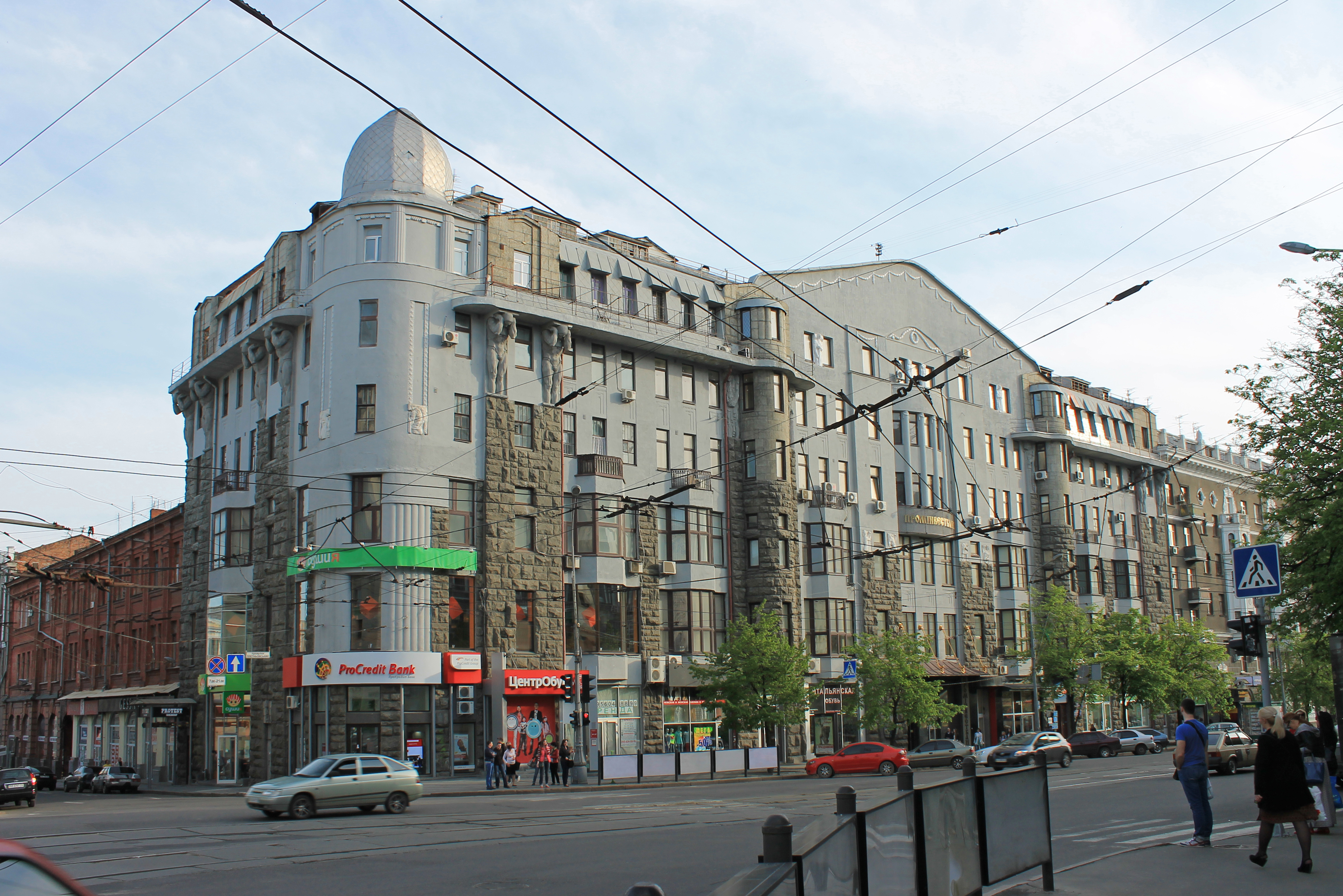
The first building of Rzhepishevsky. City Merchant Bank with the Astoria Hotel (1910–1913)

Author of 27 buildings in Kharkiv in the National Romantic style (in Kharkiv known as Ukrainian: північний модерн, romanized: pivnichnyy modern, lit. 'northern modern'), many of which are architectural monuments.

- 1910–1913 — City Merchant Bank with the Astoria Hotel, in co–authorship with architect Nikolai Vasyliev, 10 Pavlivskyi Square;
- 1910 — Mindovsky Textile Factory, 6 Rizdvyana Street
- 1910 — Bakakin Textile Factory, 19 Rizdvyana Street
- 1911 — Kontrolsky's tenement house, 4 Yevhen Kotlyar Street
- 1912 — company house, known as the "House with Fountains", 6 Rymarska Street. Rzhepishevsky and architect Viktor Abramovych Estrovych lived in this house.
- 1912 — complex of warehouse and administrative buildings, 5 Yaroslavska Street
- 1912–1913 — P.M. Livshits's house, 7 Yulia Chyhyryn Street
- 1912–1913 — House of the Oleninska Children's Hospital Society, 5 Kholodnoyarska Street
- 1913 — Moldavsky merchant's tenement house, 15 Darvin Street
- 1913 — residential building, 8 Mykhailya Semenka Street
- 1913 — residential building, 33 Yaroslava Mudroho Street
- 1913 — tenement house, 8 Sadova Street
- 1914 — mansion of the actor, head of the Kharkiv Theater M.M. Synelnikov, 29 Darvin Street
- 1914 — Max Gelferich's tenement house, 14 Chornohlazivska Street
- 1914 — House of the Society of Private Apartments, 19 Rymarska Street. Rzhepishevsky lived in this house.
- 1914 — O.I. Melgunova's tenement house, 8 Yulia Chyhyryn Street
- 1914 — Manus Volovnyk merchant's tenement house, 3 Hryhoriya Skovorody Street
- 1914 — company house, 6 Nimetskyy passage
- 1914 — tenement house, 17 Mykhailya Semenka Street
- 1914 — Professor Brandt's private clinic, 23 Yaroslava Mudroho Street
- 1915 – Moldavsky merchant's house, 4 Darvin Street
- 1915 — Red Cross hospital, 5 Oboronny Val Square
- 1915 — Dmytro Abramov merchant's house, 21 Myronosytska Street

The Dolossy sanatorium was built in Yalta according to his design.

Author of several houses on the Garden Ring in Moscow and the mansion of industrialist A. Rebinder in Shebekino (Kursk Governorate).

== Gallery ==
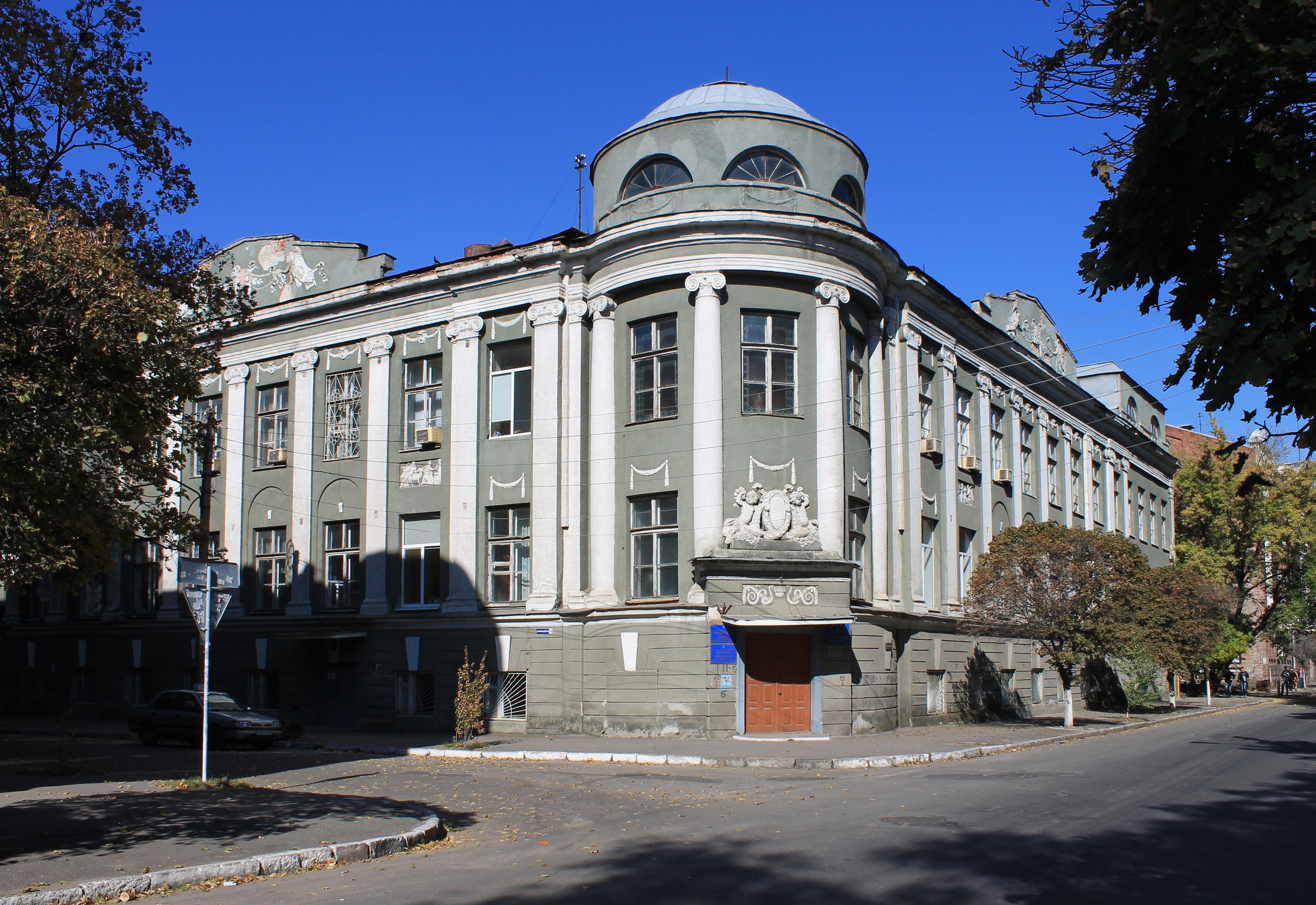
Red Cross hospital

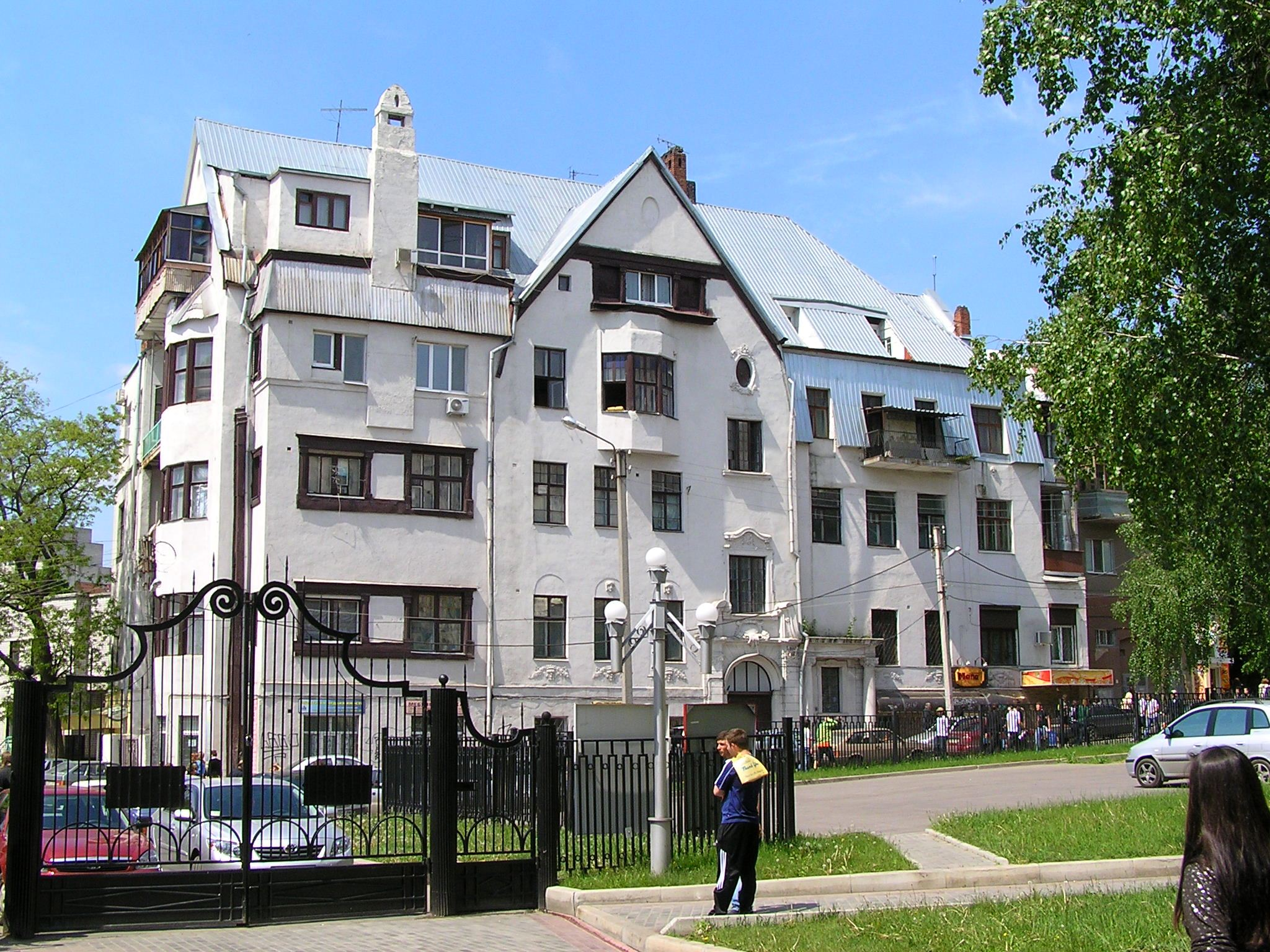
Max Gelferich's tenement house

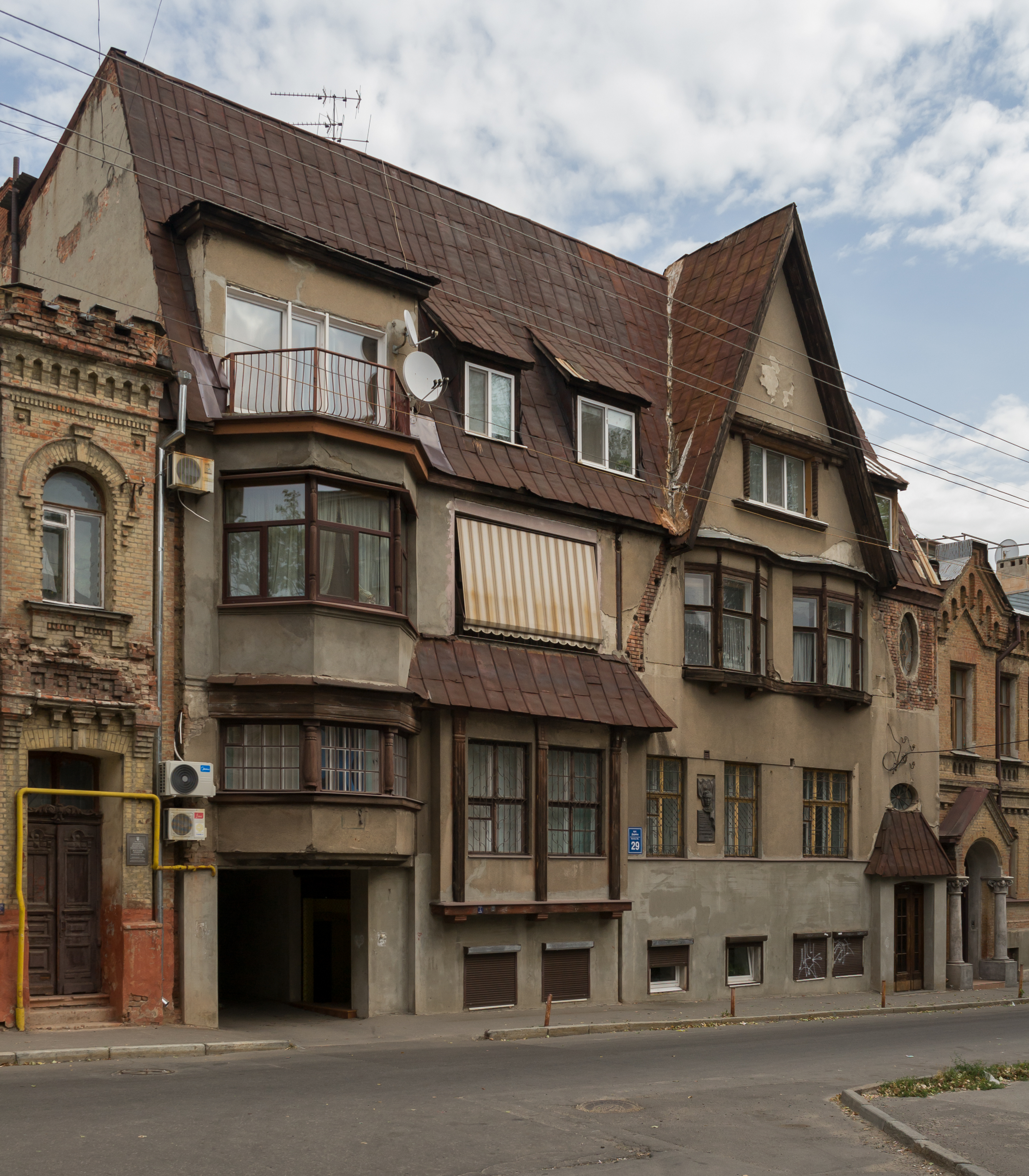
Mansion of the actor M.Synelnikov

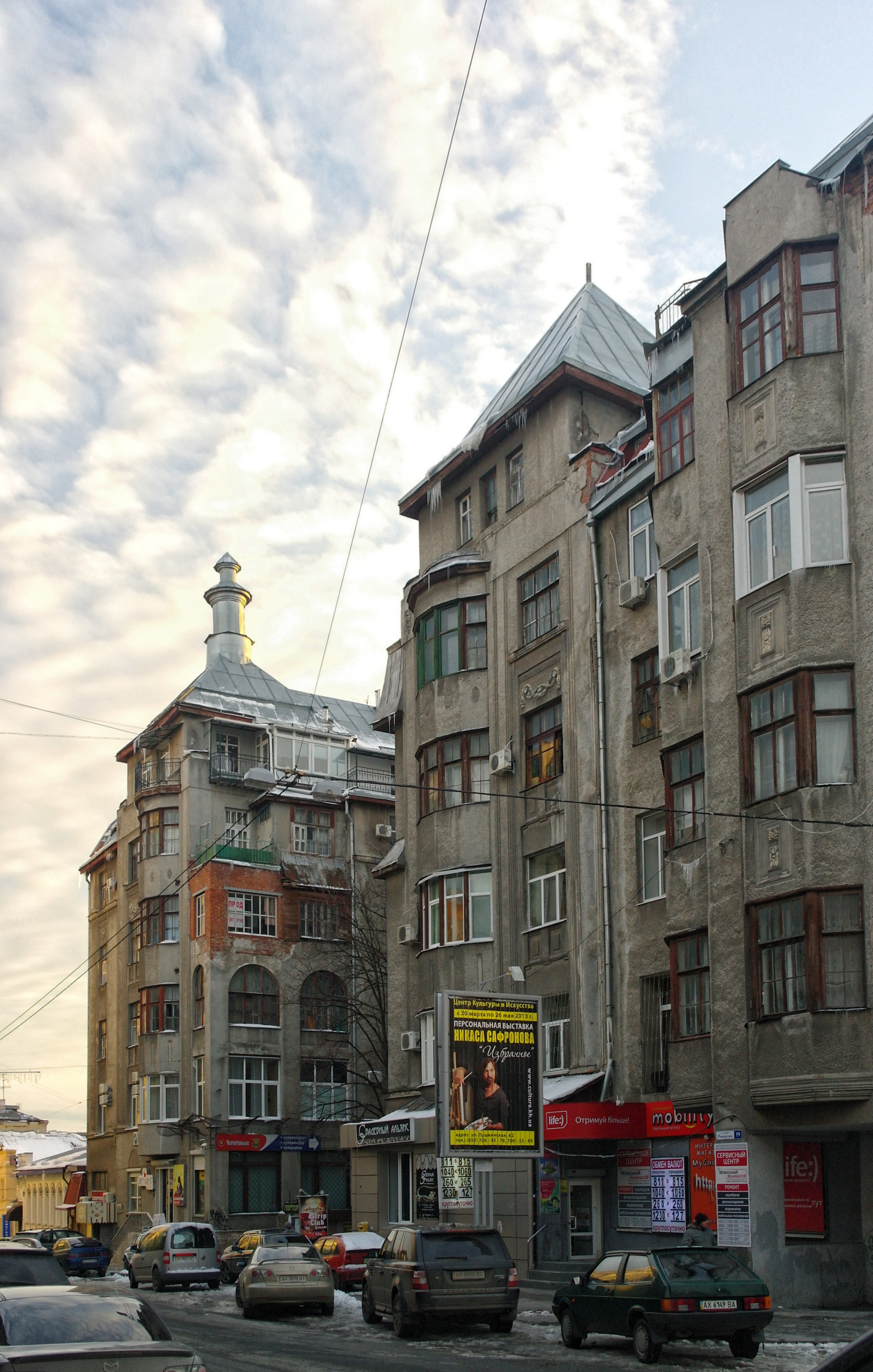
House of the Society of Private Apartments

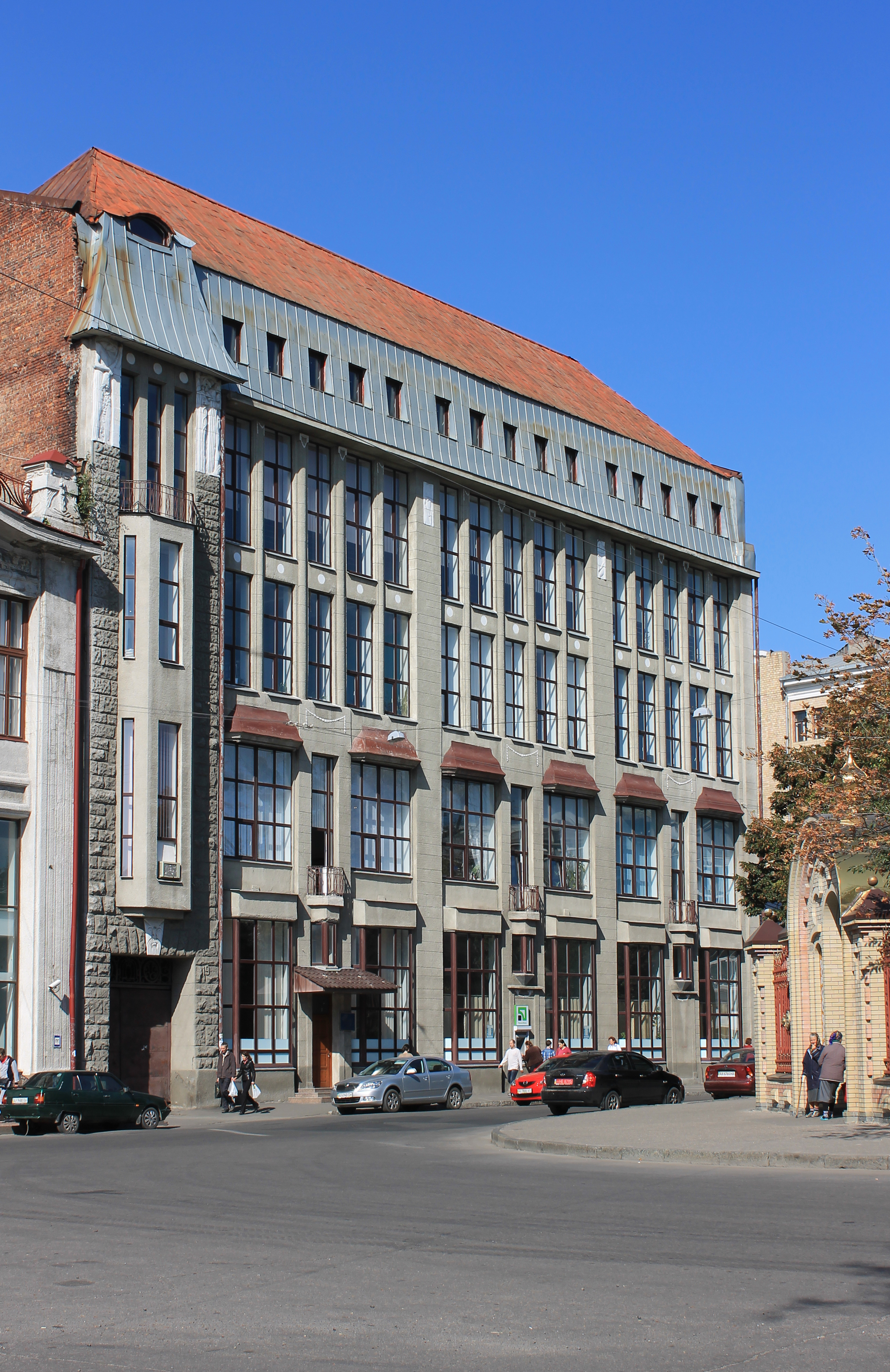
Bakakin Textile Factory

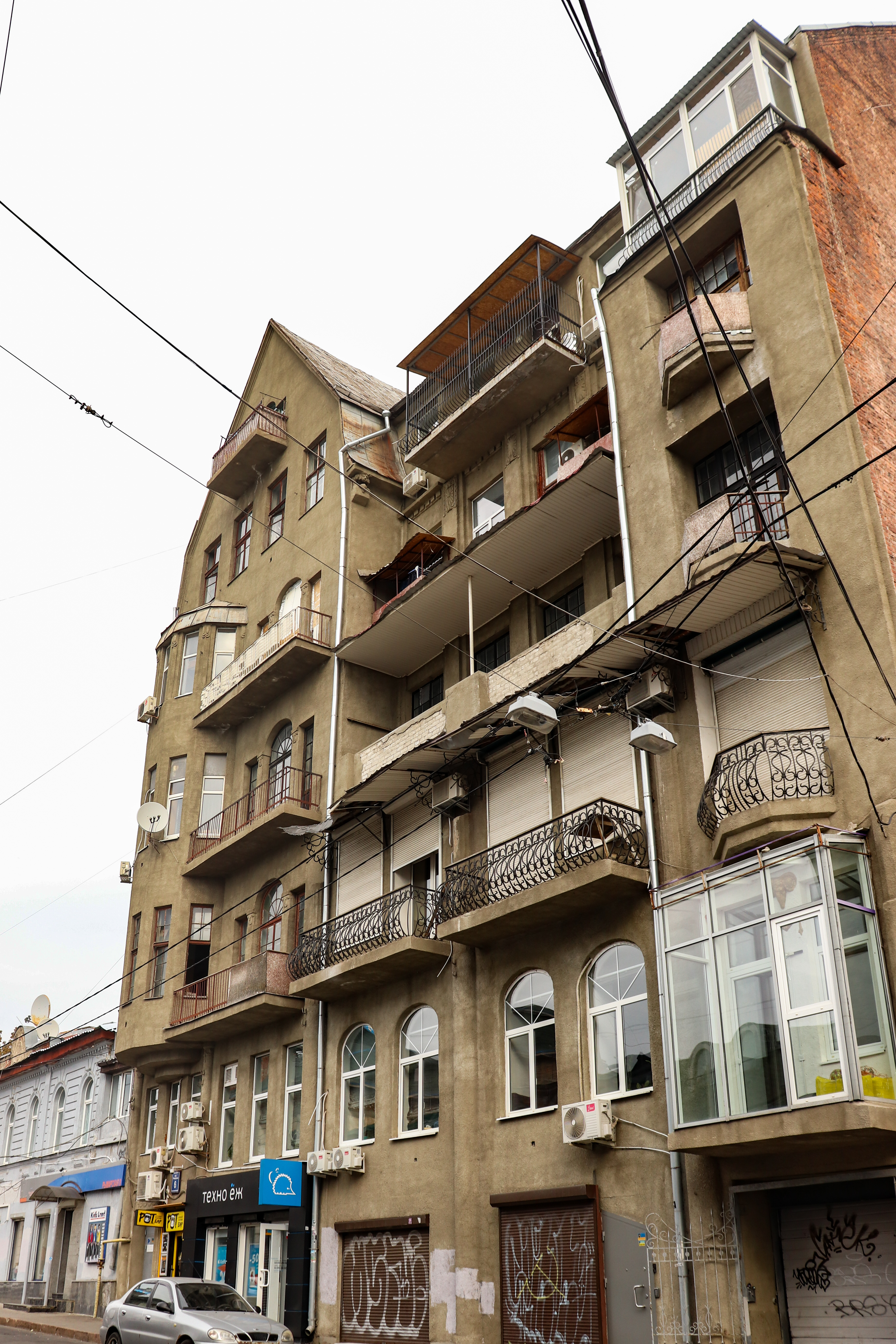
"House with Fountains"

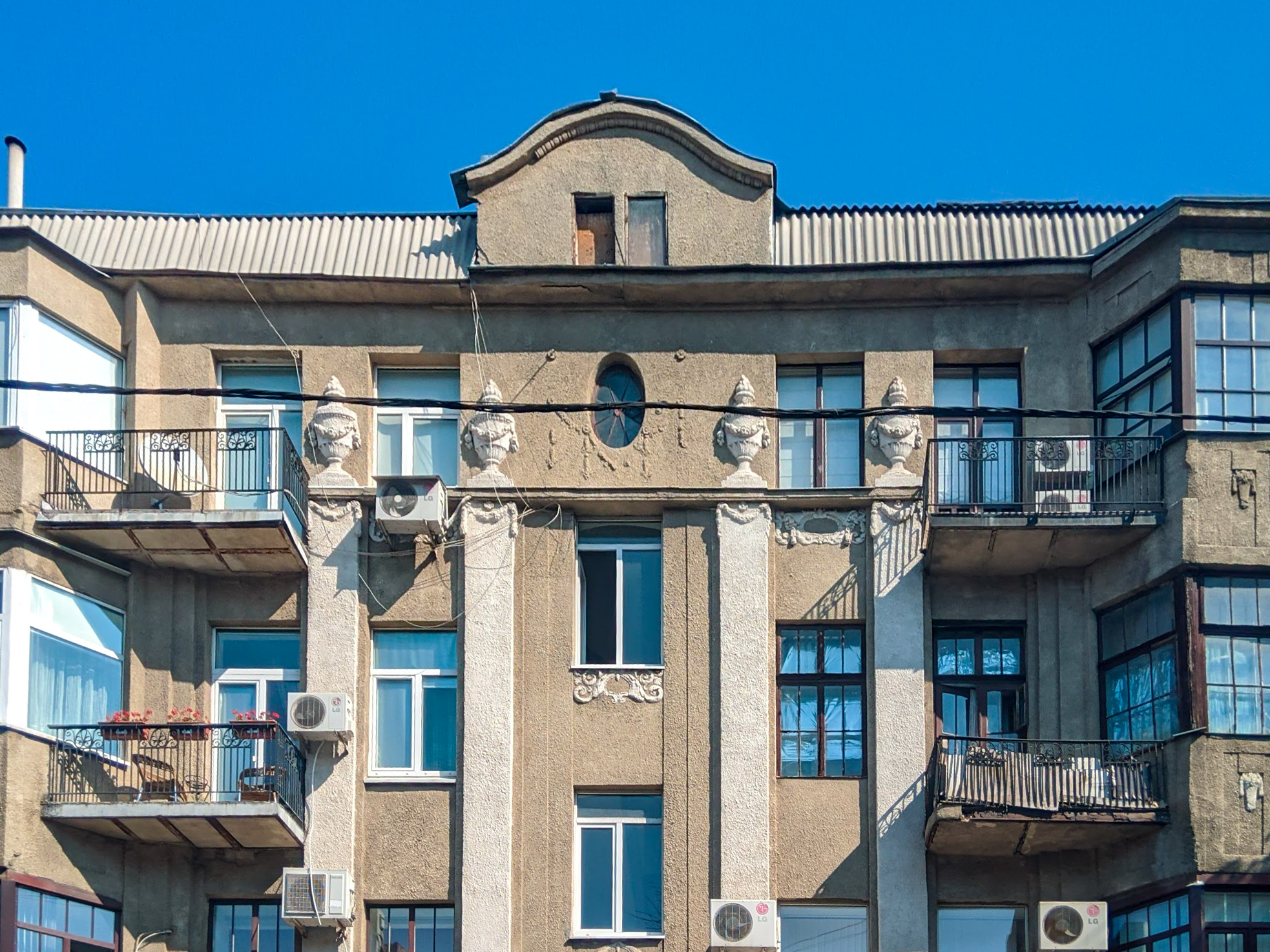
33 Yaroslava Mudroho Street

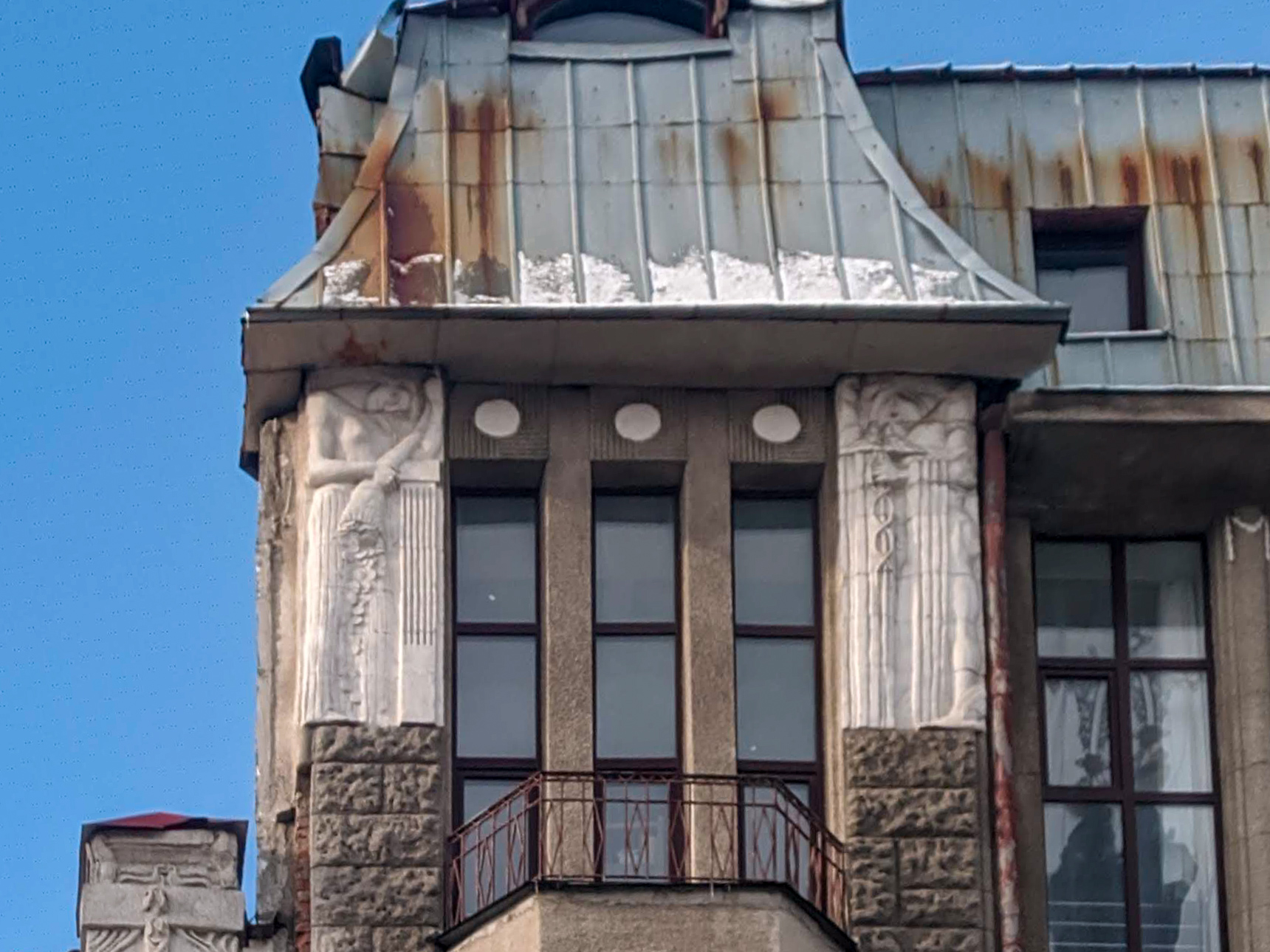
Bakakin Textile Factory

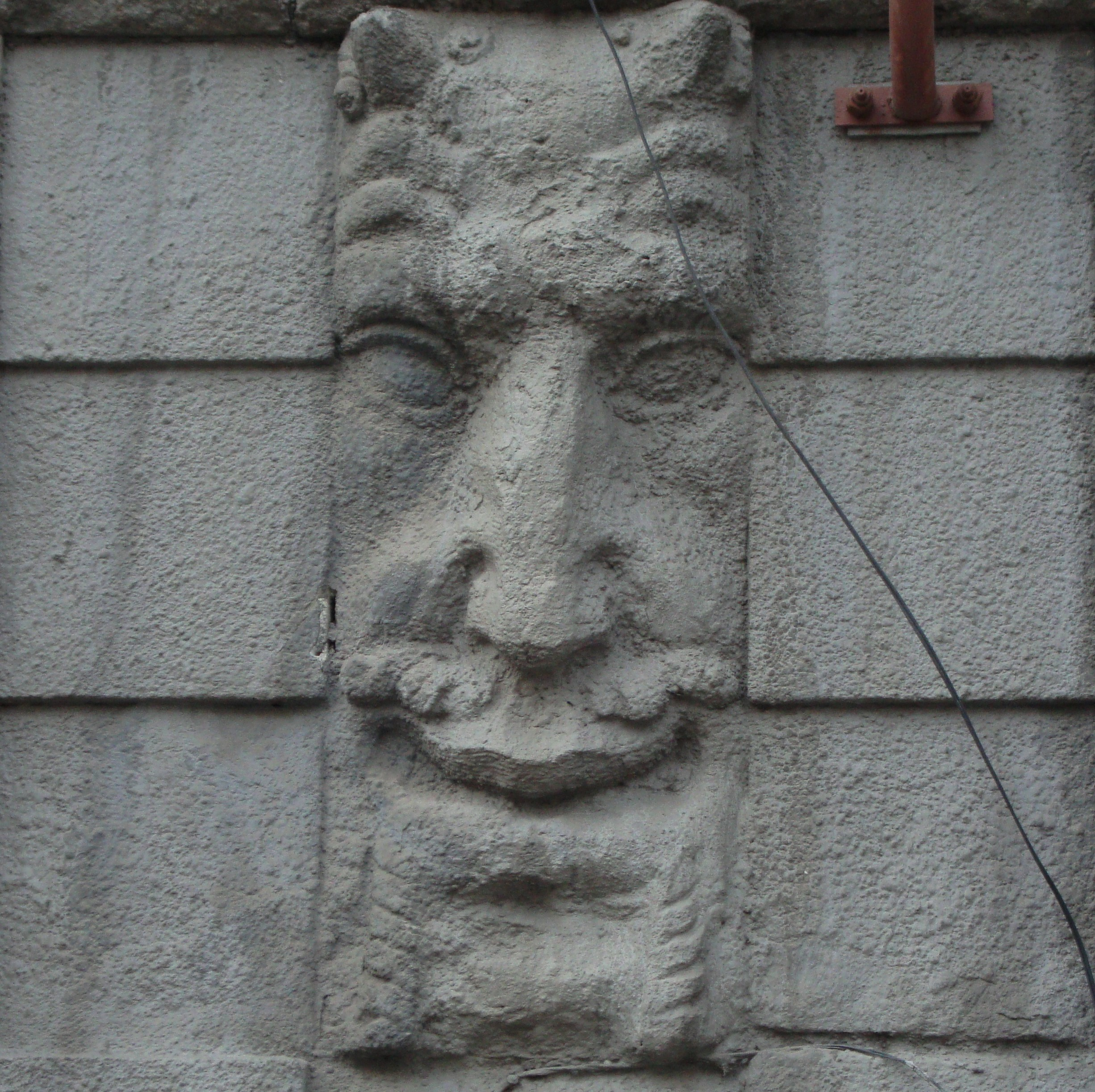
City Merchant Bank with the Astoria Hotel

== Sources ==
- Materials of periodicals.
- Polyakova Yu. Yu. Architects of Kharkiv of Polish origin / Yu. Yu. Polyakova // Polish diaspora in Kharkiv: history and modernity: Materials of science. conf., Kharkiv, 24 April. 2004 / Consulate General of the Republic of Poland in Kharkiv, Polish House in Kharkiv. – Kh., Maidan, 2004. – P. 111–124
- Lisovsky V. G., Isachenko V. G. Nikolai Vasiliev, Alexei Bubyr. – St. Petersburg: White and Black, 1999. – 287 p. – (Architects of St. Petersburg). – ISBN 978-5-89771-011-9
- Shkodovsky Yu.M., Lavrentiev I.N., Leibfreid I.N., Polyakova Yu.Yu.; Artist–designer Yukhtman A.S. Kharkiv yesterday, today, tomorrow. – Kharkiv: Folio, 2002. – P. 36,105, 115, 120, 122, 124, 125, 139, 148. – 5000 copies. – ISBN 978-966-03-1743-7.
- Calendar of significant and memorable dates of Kharkiv region, 2014: recommended. bibliogr. index. – Kharkiv: Department of Culture and Tourism of Kharkiv region state. admin.; Kharkiv region universal science library, 2013. – P. 34–35.
