= Dmitry Vasilyev =

Dmitry Vasilyev may refer to:

- Dmitriy Vassiliev (born 1979), Russian ski jumper
- Dmitry Vasilyev (biathlete) (born 1962), Soviet biathlete and Olympic champion
- Dmitri Vasilyev (director) (1900–1984), Soviet film director
- Dmitry Vasilyev (herpetologist) (1963–2025), Russian herpetologist
- Dmitri Vasilyev (runner), Russian runner who participated in the 2000 Summer Olympics
- Dmitri Vasilyev (footballer, born 1977) (Dmitri Vladimirovich Vasilyev), Russian international footballer with FC Shinnik Yaroslavl and FC Rubin Kazan
- Dmitri Vasilyev (footballer, born 1985), Russian footballer with FC Shinnik Yaroslavl and FC Krylia Sovetov Samara
- Dmitri Vasilyev (footballer, born 2004), Russian footballer with FC Zenit Saint Petersburg
- Dmitri Dmitriyevich Vasilyev (1945–2003), leader of the Russian nationalistic Pamyat movement
