= Nikolay Vasilyev =

Nikolai Vasilyev may refer to:

- Nicolai Vasiliev, a possibly fictitious Russian suggested as a Jack the Ripper suspect
- Nikolay Vasiliev (Russian politician) (born 1958), Russian politician
- Nicolai A. Vasiliev (1880–1940), Russian logician
- Nikolay Vasilyev (colonel) (Nikolay Ivanovich Vasilyev, 1906–1941), Soviet army officer
- Nikolai Vasilyevich Vasilyev (1875–1940), Russian architect
- Nikolay Vasilyev (hurdler) (born 1956), Soviet hurdler
- Nikolay Vasilyev (rower) (born 1952), Soviet rower who participated at the 1972 Summer Olympics
- Nikolai Viktorovich Vasilyev (born 1957), Soviet Russian football player and coach
