= Nikolay Vasilyev (colonel) =

Red Army colonel (1906–1941)

Nikolay Ivanovich Vasilyev
- Born: 27 October 1906; Zaraysk, Ryazan Governorate, Russian Empire
- Died: September 1941 (aged 34) north of Piryatin, Ukrainian SSR, Soviet Union
- Military career
- Allegiance: Soviet Union
- Branch: Red Army
- Service years: 1926–1941
- Rank: Colonel
- Commands: 87th Rifle Division
- Conflicts: World War II
- Awards: Order of the Red Banner

Nikolay Ivanovich Vasilyev (Russian: Николай Иванович Васильев; 27 October 1906–September 1941) was a Red Army colonel killed in World War II.

Drafted into the Red Army in the late 1920s, Vasilyev became a junior officer after graduating from a military school and held command and staff positions during the 1930. Just before the beginning of World War II, Vasilyev became a regimental commander and was decorated for his leadership of the unit during the Winter War. After the end of the latter, he became deputy division commander of the 87th Rifle Division, succeeding to command after his division commander was killed in the first days after the beginning of Operation Barbarossa. Vasilyev was himself killed in the Battle of Kiev.

== Early life and prewar service ==
Vasilyev was born on 27 October 1906 in Zaraysk, Ryazan Governorate. Drafted into the Red Army in October 1926, he was sent to study at the VTsIK Combined Military School in Moscow. After graduation in October 1929, he was sent to the 47th Rifle Regiment of the 16th Rifle Division in the Leningrad Military District. He served with the regiment for nearly ten years, including as a rifle platoon commander, regimental school platoon commander, machine gun company commander, battalion chief of staff, head of the regimental school, and commander of its training battalion. In March 1939 he was transferred to the 46th Rifle Regiment as assistant regimental commander for personnel. In August of that year he was appointed commander of the 461st Rifle Regiment of the 142nd Rifle Division. During the Winter War the regiment and division fought in heavy combat with the 19th Rifle Corps of the 7th Army on the Karelian Isthmus. For his "skillful command of the regiment, courage, and heroism", Vasilyev, then a major, was awarded the Order of the Red Banner. After the end of the war, in May 1940, he was appointed deputy commander and chief of the infantry of the 87th Rifle Division of the Kiev Special Military District.

== World War II ==
At the beginning of Operation Barbarossa on 22 June 1941, the 87th was part of the 5th Army, which became part of the Southwestern Front (formed from the Kiev Special Military District), based in the area of Vladimir-Volynsky. The division was one of the first struck by the German advance, participating in the border battles. Vasilyev became commander of the division after division commander Major General Filipp Alyabushev was killed after stumbling on a German unit while reconnoitering a highway crossing site on 25 June. From 7 July to 20 August it was directly subordinated to the front command, then joined the 37th Army for the Battle of Kiev. After Kiev fell to the German advance on 19 September, the 87th was encircled with the 37th Army in a pocket around Boryspil to the southeast of the city. Vasilyev's 87th Rifle Division and the 4th Railway Protection Division of the NKVD formed the rearguard of the army as it attempted to break out of the pocket and escape to the east. After sappers from the 37th Army and the 4th Division blew up the bridges over the Dnieper, the commander of the NKVD division contacted Vasilyev to coordinate further actions. Early in the morning of 20 September, both units reached the eastern edge of the Darnitsky forest. A reconnaissance by the NKVD troops found that the planned escape route via Boryspil was blocked by German troops, and the fighting devolved into increasingly desperate breakout attempts. During the latter, Vasilyev was killed in action north of Piryatin. He was survived by his wife, Anna Georgievna.
