= 87th Rifle Division =

Former Soviet military unit

The 87th Rifle Division was an infantry division of the Red Army, active before, during the Second World War and afterwards.

== First formation ==
It formed in the first half of 1936 in the Kiev Military District as the personnel division for the defense in the Korosten Fortified Area with the subordination of its divisions. It was based in the Belokorovichi area.

In September 1939, it took part in the annexation of Western Ukraine and as of 17 September and 2 October 1939 was part of the 15th Rifle Corps of the 5th Army Ukrainian Front. September 19th Division near Kostopil entered into battle with Polish forces of up to two infantry regiments.

Major General Filipp Alyabushev commanded the division between 13 March and his death on 25 June 1941. He was replaced by Colonel Nikolay Ivanovich Vasilyev, who commanded the division until its destruction.

By June 1941, it included the 16th, 96th, and 283rd Rifle Regiments, the 197th Artillery Regiment, the 212th Howitzer Artillery Regiment, and smaller units.

It was officially disbanded on 19 September 1941.

== Second formation ==
The division was reformed from the 3rd Airborne Corps on 20 November 1941; the commander of the latter, Colonel Alexander Rodimtsev, continued in command of the 87th for the duration of its existence. It included the 16th, 96th, and 283rd Rifle Regiments, the 197th Artillery Regiment, and smaller units. It was converted into the 13th Guards Rifle Division on 19 January 1942.

== Third formation ==
The division was reformed in 1942. It included the 1378th, 1379th, and 1382nd Rifle Regiments, the 1058th Artillery Regiment, and smaller units. It was part of the active army from 21 July to 14 September 1942, 23 November 1942 to 10 September 1943, 16 October 1943 to 20 May 1944, and 1 July 1944 to the end of the war in Europe. Wartime commanders were Colonel Alexander Ignatyevich Kazartsyev from 8 March to 27 December 1942, Lieutenant Colonel Mikhail Sergeyevich Yekhokhin (promoted to colonel 22 March 1943) from 28 December 1942 to 2 August 1943, Lieutenant Colonel Georgy Stepanovich Ivanov (promoted to colonel 21 September 1943) from 5 August 1943 to 1 May 1944, and Colonel Georgy Petrovich Kulyako from 2 May 1944 to after the end of the war.

In August 1945, it was withdrawn to Izhevsk in the Kazan Military District with the 10th Rifle Corps. There, it was reduced to the 12th Separate Rifle Brigade in 1946, and became part of the Ural Military District with the corps after the Kazan Military District was disbanded in May 1946. The latter was disbanded in March 1947.

It had the honorifics Perekop Red Banner.
