= Saint Petersburg Mosque =

Mosque in Saint Petersburg, Russia

Coordinates: 59.955247°N 30.323896°E

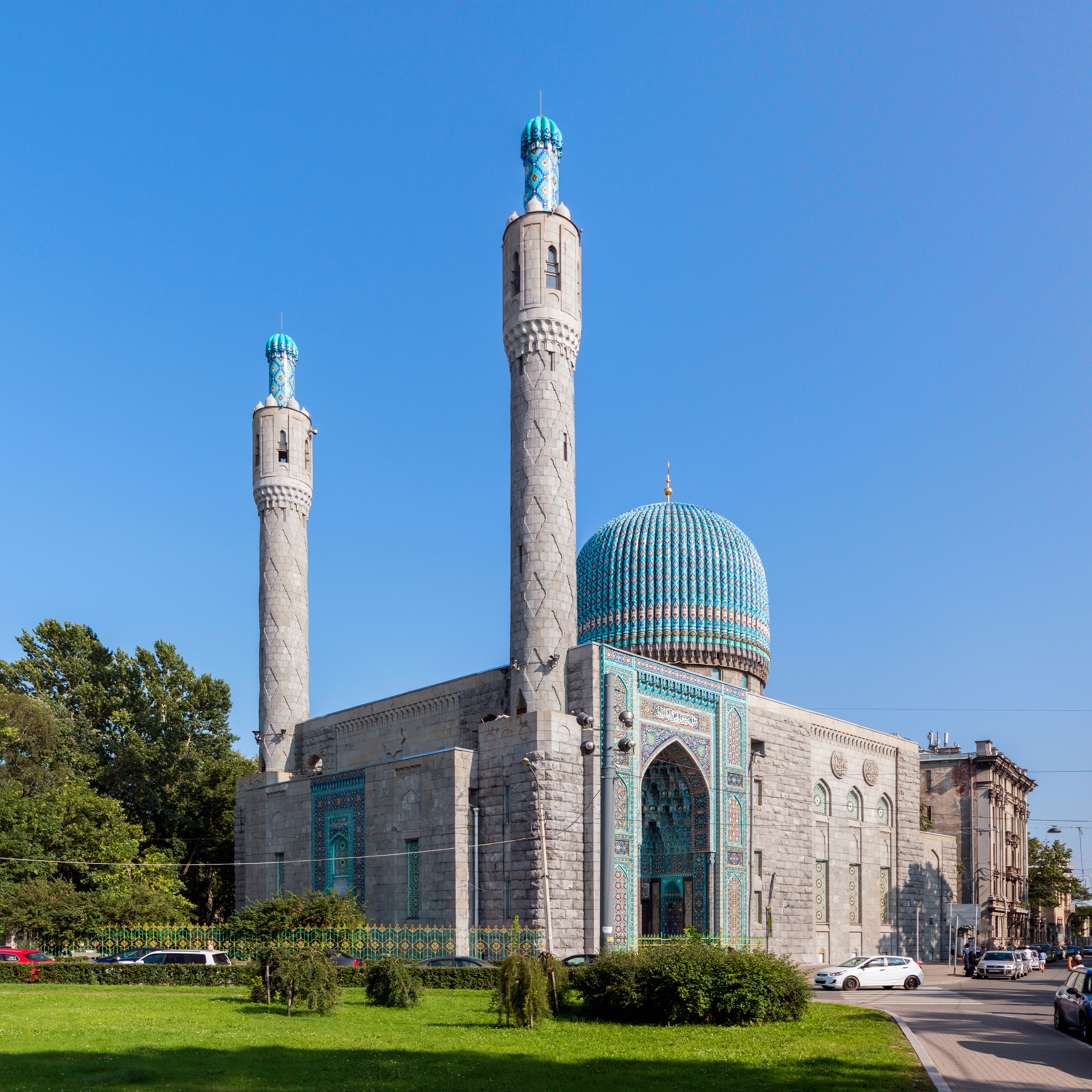

Religion
- Affiliation: Islam
- Status: Active

Location
- Location: St. Petersburg, Russia
- Interactive map of Saint Petersburg Mosque

Architecture
- Architect: Nikolai Vasilyev
- Type: mosque
- Style: Timurid architecture, with modern influence.
- Completed: 1921

Specifications
- Capacity: 5,000
- Dome: 1
- Dome height (outer): 39 meters
- Minaret: 2
- Minaret height: 49 meters

The Saint Petersburg Mosque (Russian: Санкт-Петербу́ргская мече́ть), when opened in 1913, was the largest mosque in Europe outside Turkey. The mosque is situated in downtown St Petersburg. Its two minarets are 49 meters high and the dome is 39 meters high. It can accommodate up to five thousand worshippers.

The founding stone was laid in 1910 to commemorate the 25th anniversary of the reign of Abdul Ahat Khan in Bukhara. By that time, the Muslim community of the Russian then-capital exceeded 8,000 people. The projected structure was capable of accommodating most of them. The architect Nikolai Vasilyev patterned the mosque after Gur-e-Amir, the tomb of Timur in Samarkand. Its construction was completed by 1921.

Worshippers are separated by gender during worship service; women worship on the upper floor, while the men worship on the ground floor. During World War II, the mosque was closed, and it was only reopened in 1956, during the Cold War.

== History ==
In 1882, Selim-Giray Tevkelev who in 1865 was appointed the Mufti of Orenburg obtained permission, from minister Count Tolstoy, to build a mosque in St. Petersburg. In 1906, the Minister formed a special committee headed by Ahun Ataulla Bayazitov to collect 750,000 rubles within 10 years for the construction of the mosque. They organised collections all over Russia and received donations from many sponsors. The largest donor was Abdul Ahad Khan, the Emir of Bukhara, who undertook all expenses for the building.

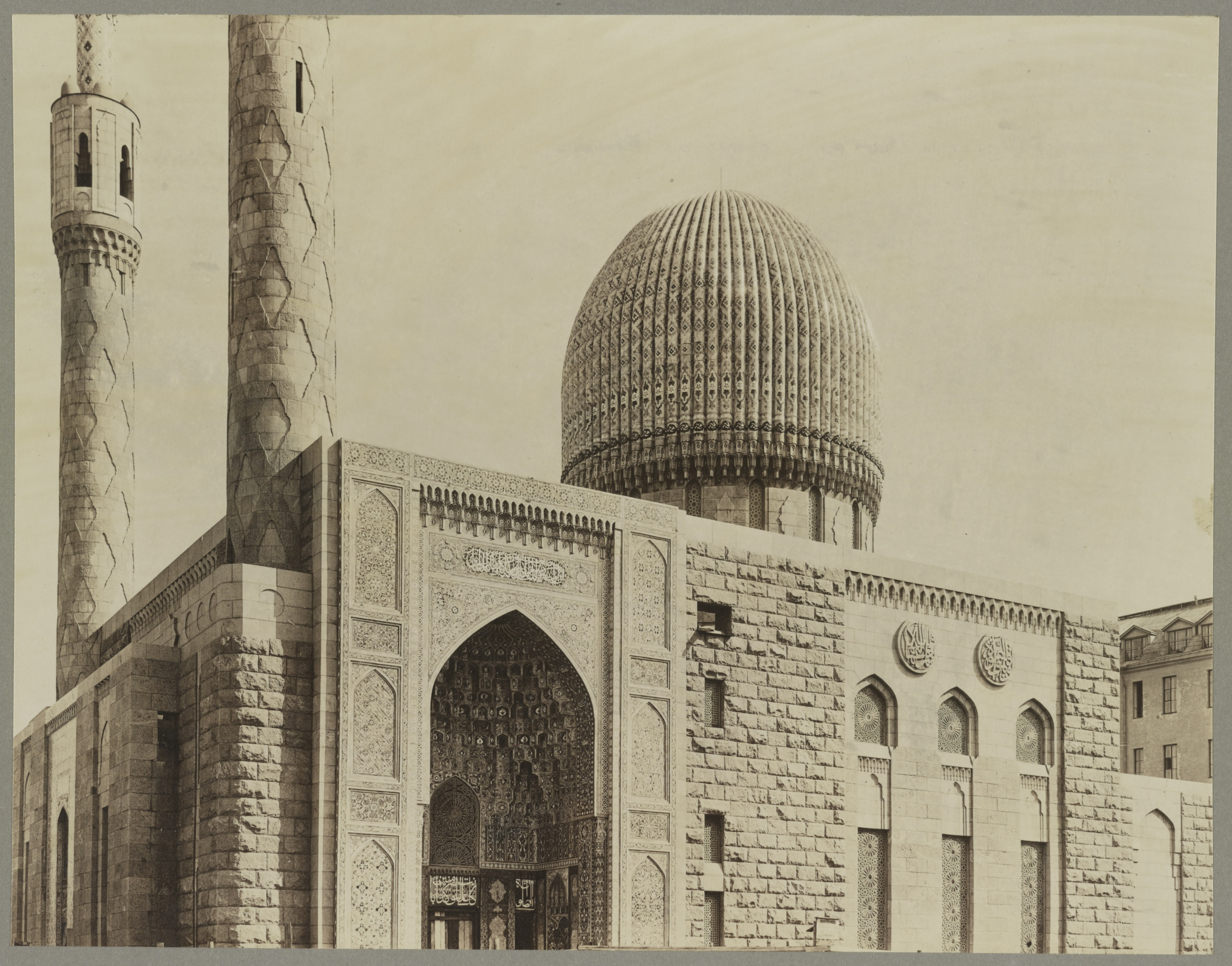
Mosque in 1917

The location of the mosque was symbolic, sited opposite the Peter and Paul Fortress, in the city centre. The permission to purchase the site was given by Emperor Nicholas II in Peterhof on 3 July 1907. That autumn, the committee approved the project by architect Nikolai Vasilyev, engineer Stepan Krichinsky, with construction overseen by Alexander von Hohen. The building facade was made by combining both oriental ornaments and a turquoise blue mosaic.

On 3 February 1910, Ahun Bayazitov laid the cornerstone for the building, attended by government, religious and social figures. Among those who attended were Mohammed Alim Khan, the ambassadors of the Ottoman Empire, and Persia, and Tevkelev, the leader of the Muslim party in the Duma.

The walls are made of grey granite and the dome and both minarets are covered with mosaic ceramics of a sky blue colour. These were created by Peter Vaulin in his workshop in Kikerino. In addition, many skilled craftsmen from Central Asia took part working on the mosque. The facades are decorated with verses from the Qur'an using Arabic calligraphy. Internal columns are made from green marble. The mosque was covered by huge specially made carpets woven by Central Asian craftsmen.

In 1940, Soviet authorities banned services and turned the building into a medical equipment storehouse. At the request of the first Indonesian President, Sukarno, ten days after his visit to the city, the mosque was returned to the Muslim religious community of St. Petersburg in 1956. A major restoration of the mosque was carried out in 1980.

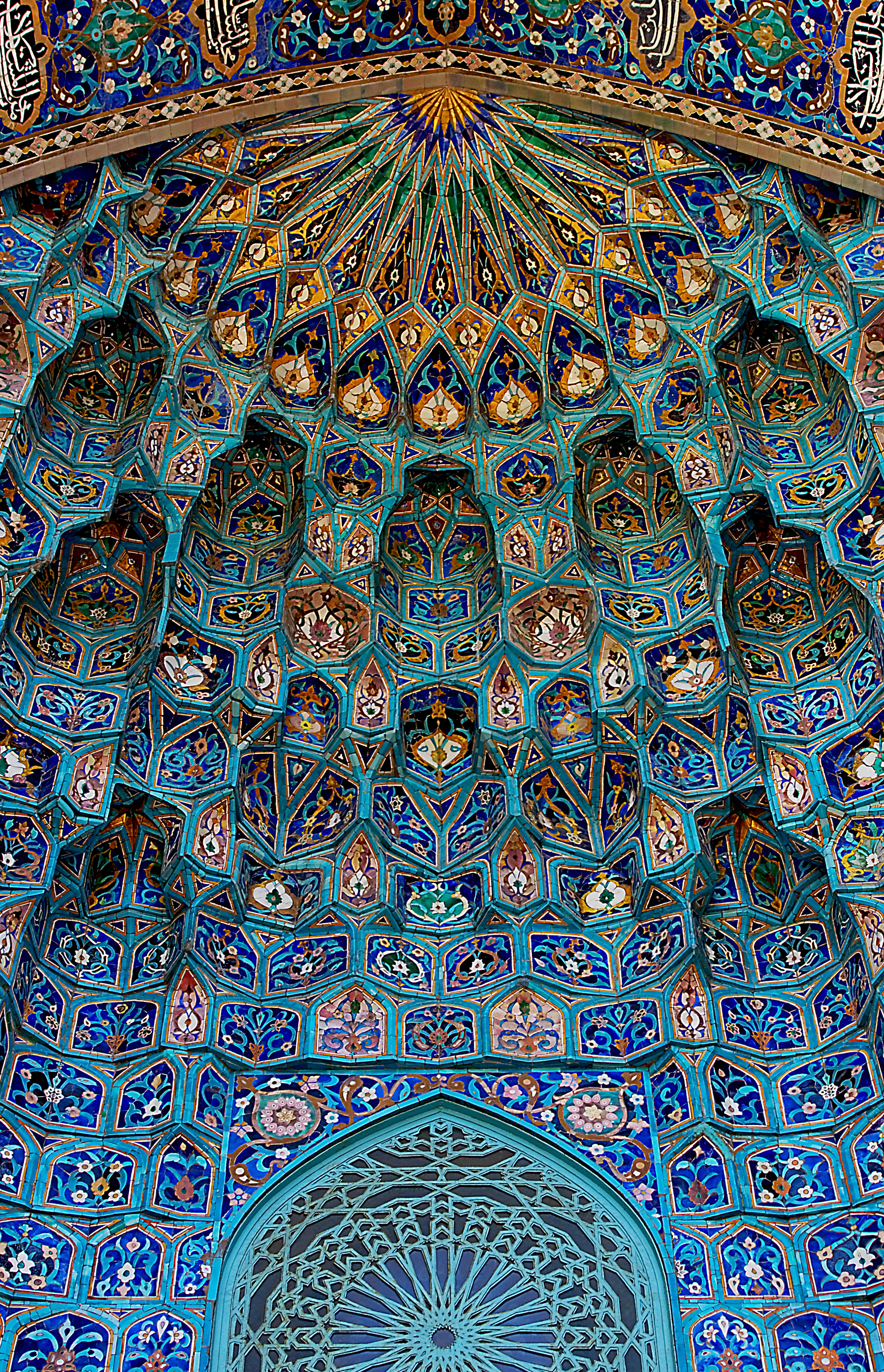
The inside of one portal, with muqarnas, and majolica ceramic

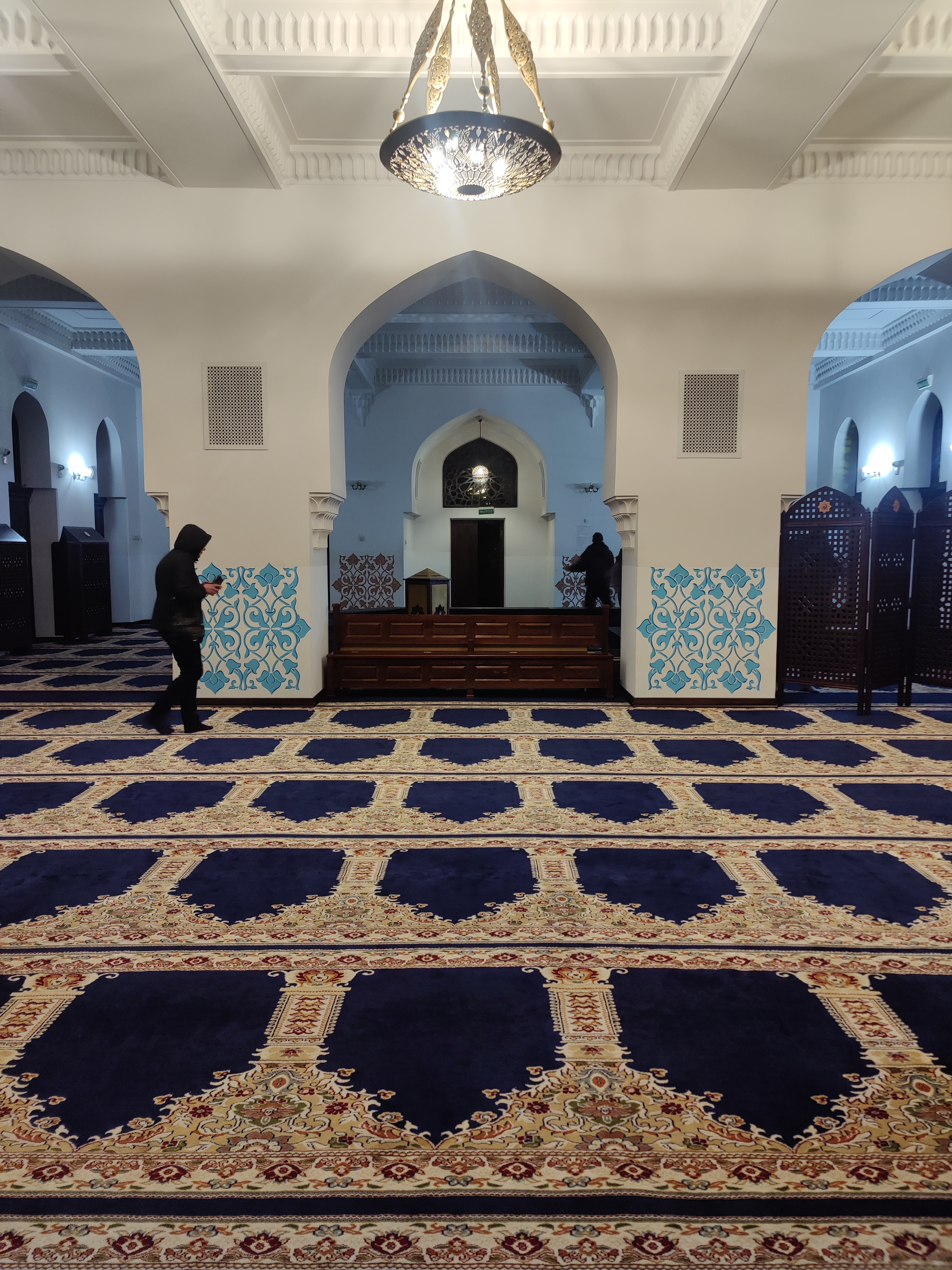
Interiors

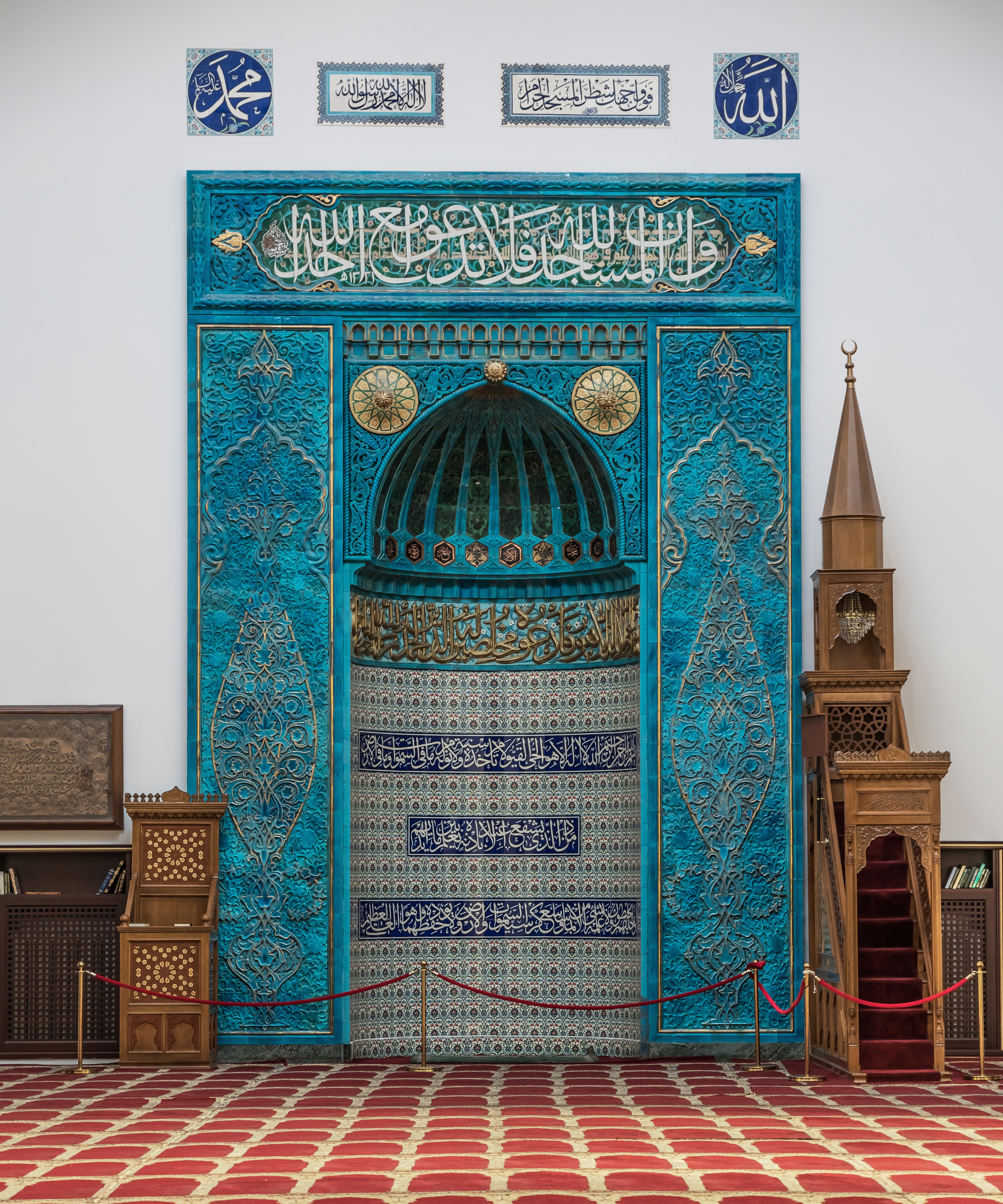
Mihrab and minbar

== See also ==
- Islam in Russia
- List of mosques in Russia
- List of mosques in Europe
