= Vasiļjevs =

Vasiļjevs (feminine: Vasiļjeva) is a Latvian patronymic surname of Russian origin (from Russian surname Vasilyev). Individuals with the surname include:

- Deniss Vasiļjevs, (born 1999), Latvian figure skater;
- Edmunds Vasiļjevs (born 1954), Latvian ice hockey player;
- Haralds Vasiļjevs (born 1952), Latvian ice hockey player and coach;
- Herberts Vasiļjevs (born 1976), Latvian ice hockey player
- Tatjana Vasiljeva, Latvian snooker player
