= Filipp Alyabushev =

Soviet general

Filipp Fyodorovich Alyabushev
- Born: November 13, 1893
- Died: June 25, 1941 (aged 47)
- Military career
- Allegiance: Russian Empire; Soviet Union
- Branch: Imperial Russian Army; Soviet Red Army
- Service years: 1914–1917 (Russian Empire); 1918–1941 (Soviet Union)
- Commands: 14th Rifle Division; 87th Rifle Division
- Conflicts: World War I; Russian Civil War; Second Sino-Japanese War; World War II; Winter War; Eastern Front; Operation Barbarossa †

Filipp Fyodorovich Alyabushev (Russian: Фили́пп Фёдорович Аля́бушев; November 13, 1893 – June 25, 1941) was a Soviet major general in World War II.

He fought in the Imperial Russian Army during World War I. He joined the Bolsheviks in 1918 and fought against the White movement in the subsequent civil war. He later commanded the 14th Rifle Division. He fought in the Soviet-Finnish War. At the start of the Great Patriotic War, he was the commander of the 87th Rifle Division. He was killed only 3 days into the start of Operation Barbarossa. He is reported to have asked that his division be on the frontlines of combat during Operation Barbarossa.
