= Olga Vasilyeva =

Olga Vasilyeva may refer to:

- Olga Vassiljeva (born 1977), Estonian figure skater
- Olga Vasilyeva (footballer) (born 1974), former Russian football defender
- Olga Vasilyeva (actress) (born 1972), Russian film and stage actress
- Olga Vasilyeva (politician) (born 1960), Russian politician and scientist, first female Minister of Education of Russia
