= Dmitry Vasilyev (herpetologist) =

Russian herpetologist (1963–2025)

- Дмитрий Васильев
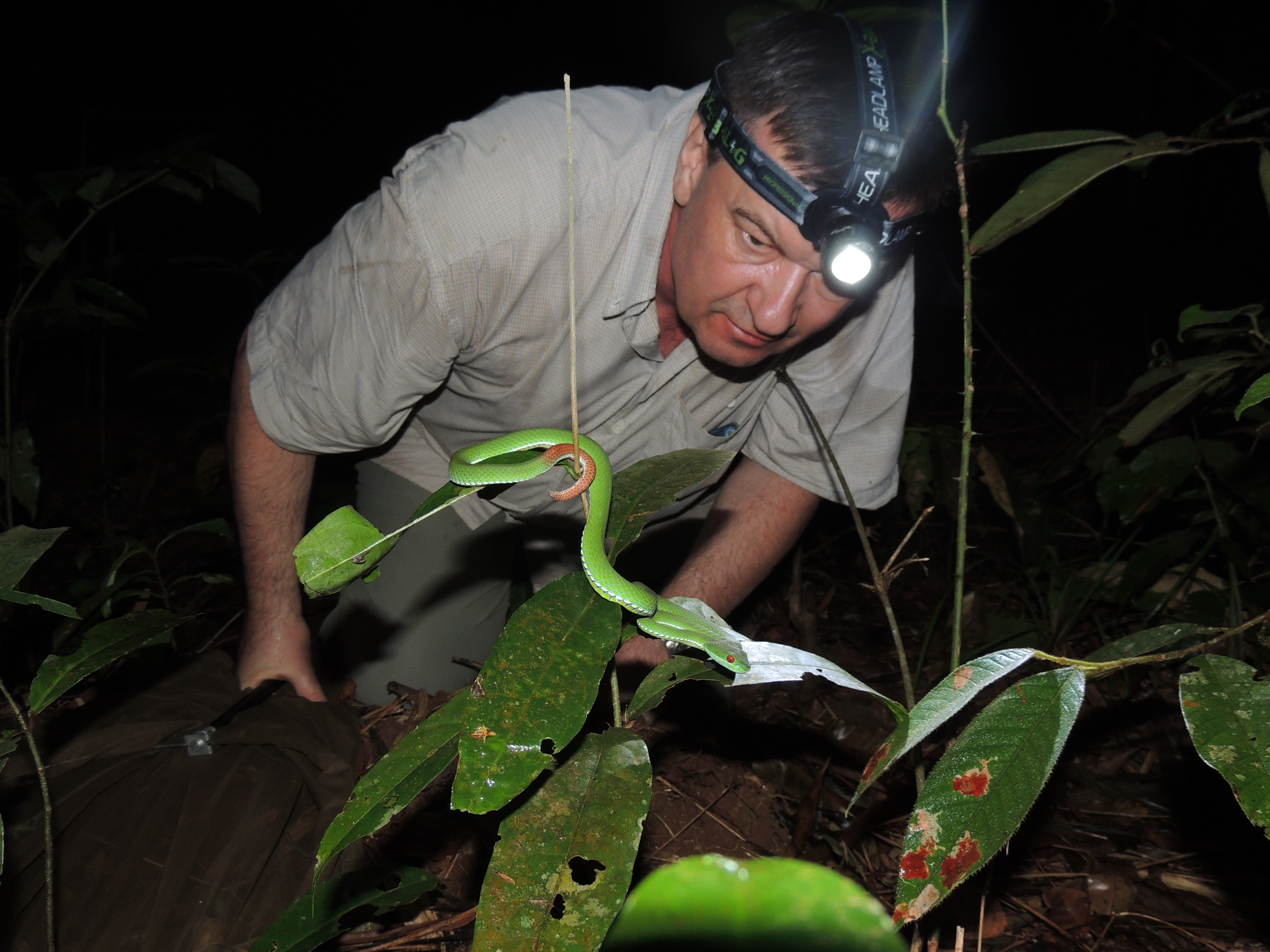
- Vasilyev in 2018
- Born: 10 October 1963; Moscow, USSR
- Died: 2 August 2025 (aged 61); Moscow, Russia
- Education: Moscow State Pedagogical Institute
- Occupation: Herpetologist

Dmitry Borisovich Vasilyev (Russian: Дмитрий Борисович Васильев; 10 October 1963 – 2 August 2025) was a Russian herpetologist and doctor of science.

== Life and career ==
Vasilyev was born in Moscow on 10 October 1963. In 1984, he entered the Faculty of Biology and Chemistry of the Moscow State Pedagogical Institute. In 1989 he graduated with honors; by that time he was already working at the Moscow Zoo.

In 1991, Vasiliev trained in Bulgaria, working in the serpentarium of the Higher Institute of Zootechnics and Veterinary Medicine in the city of Stara Zagora. In 1993, he completed an internship in four departments of the Moscow Veterinary Academy. In 1995 he trained in Sweden at the zoo of the Stockholm Skansen Museum.

On 18 May 2023, he suffered a massive heart attack, which entailed serious health consequences. He died on 2 August 2025, at the age of 61.
