= Nikolai Vasilyevich Vasilyev =

- Born: 26 November 1875; Uglich, Governorate of Yaroslavl, Russian Empire
- Died: 16 October 1958 (aged 82); Bayside, New York, United States
- Occupation: Architect

Nicholas B. Vassilieve (Russian: Николай Васильевич Васильев; 26 November 1875 – 16 October 1958) was a Russian architect, known for his works such as the German Theatre in Tallinn, or the Saint Petersburg Mosque in Saint Petersburg.

== Biography ==
Nicholas B. Vassilieve was born on 26th of November 1875 in the town of Uglich in the Governorate of Yaroslavl, His father, a native peasant, later became a member of the merchant class in St. Petersburg.

== Russia ==
After completing his military service, Vassilieve joined the Institute of Civil Engineers in 1896. Upon graduation in 1901, he received a silver medal "for architectural design". After the Institute, he entered the Russian Academy of Arts, where he studied in the studio Leon Benois. He graduated from the Academy in 1904.

Before the Revolution, he lived and worked in St. Petersburg. In 1906, he entered the Charitable Office of Empress Maria, simultaneously maintaining a private practice. Nicholas Vassilieve's primary activity was working on architectural competitions, of which he won over 90 before the Revolution. He frequently collaborated with fellow architects and former classmates. Vassilieve's outstanding creativity and imagination dominated most of his collaborative work, as his colleagues were left to finesse the plans and determine the structural engineering of the project.

Among his most successful alliances was one with his friend and former classmate Alexey Bubyr. Together they designed the Apartment House at 11 Stremianaya Street (доходный дом Угрюмовых), the German theater (Немецкий театр) in Reval (Tallinn) and the Luther House (Вилла-особняк А. Лютера) also in Reval.

Amongst the most visible works of Vassilieve remaining in St. Petersburg are the Mosque (Санкт-Петербургская соборная и кафедральная мечеть) on Kronverkski Prospect, 7., The New Passage («Новый Пассаж») at Liteiny Prospect, 57 and the Guards Economic Society Building (Торговый дом Гвардейского экономического общества) at Bolshaya Konyushennaya Street, 21-23.

Vassilieve is considered one of the leaders of the "Northern Modern" architectural movement, that emerged in St. Petersburg around 1900, influenced both by the American architect H.H. Richardson and the Finnish master Eliel Saarinen. In 1910, Nicholas Vassilieve, keeping it with a national trend, moved towards a more "neo-classical" style.

In 1918, he emigrated first to Constantinople, Turkey and then to Belgrade, Serbia before permanently emigrating to the United States in 1923, having entered and won an honorable mention prize in the 1922 Chicago Tribune Tower competition.

== NYC ==
Upon arrival in the USA his name was changed to Nicholas Vassilieff at Ellis Island and in 1928 to Nicholas B. Vassilieve in his "Petition for Naturalization".

In New York City, he worked for the Beaux-Arts firm of Warren & Wetmore from 1923 to 1931. Later, unemployed due to the Great Depression, he, nevertheless, continued to work on a part-time basis for Shreve, Lamb and Harmon as well as a freelancer for competitions. He entered and won a prize in the 1931 Palace of the Soviets Competition, switching formal idioms once more, now to a radical modernism influenced by Constructivism. In 1936, he joined the New York City Tunnel Authority and in 1938 joined the New York City Planning Commission, where he worked until his retirement at age 77.

== Works ==
- 1901: Kazan church and chapel on the Krasnenkoe cemetery, Saint Petersburg
- 1910: German Theatre (Pärnu mnt 5; now Estonian Drama Theatre) in Tallinn, with Alexey Bubyr
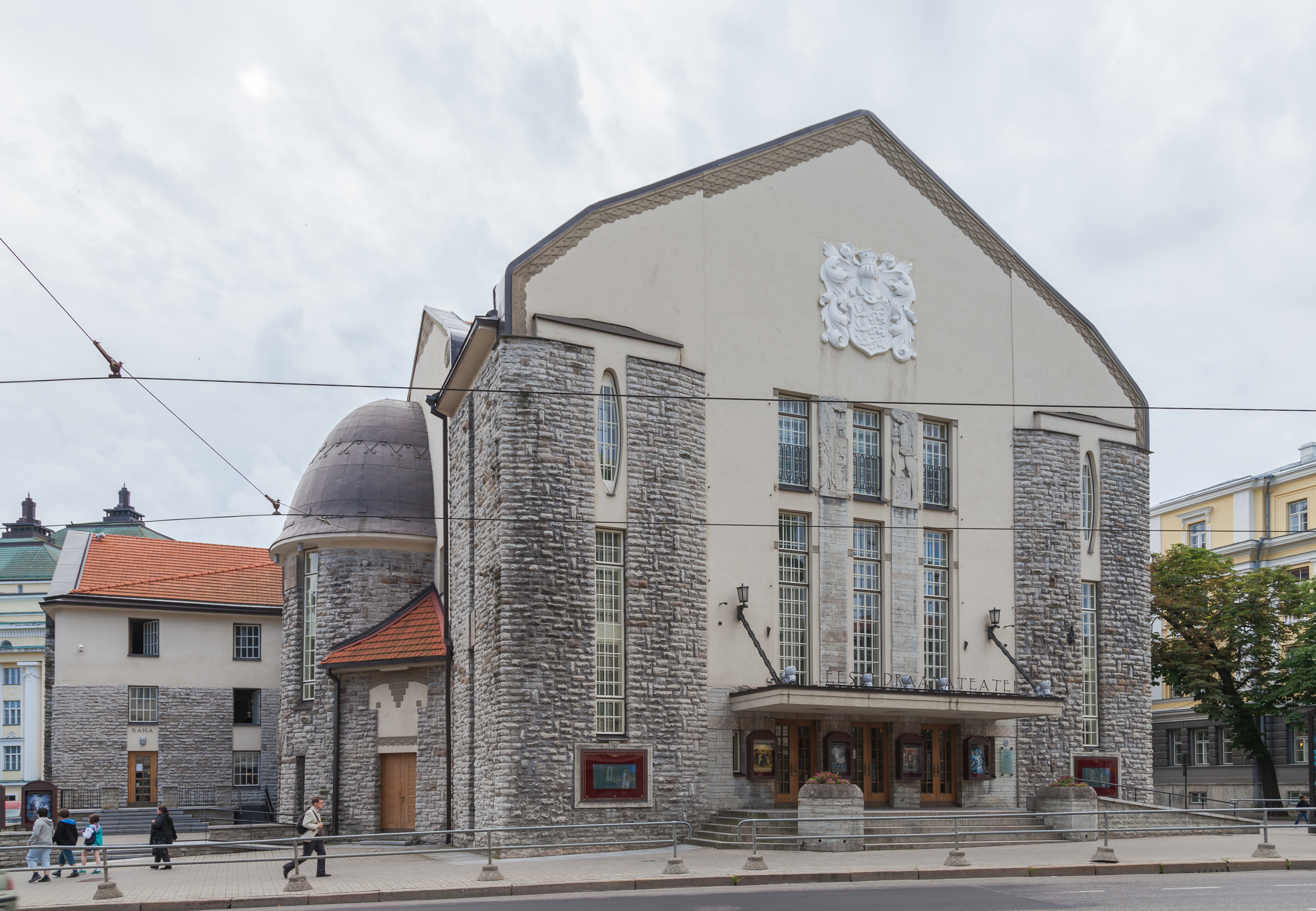
  German Theatre
- 1909–1910: Luther Villa (Pärnu mnt 67; now a civil registry office) in Tallinn, with Alexey Bubyr
- 1909: Saint Petersburg Mosque
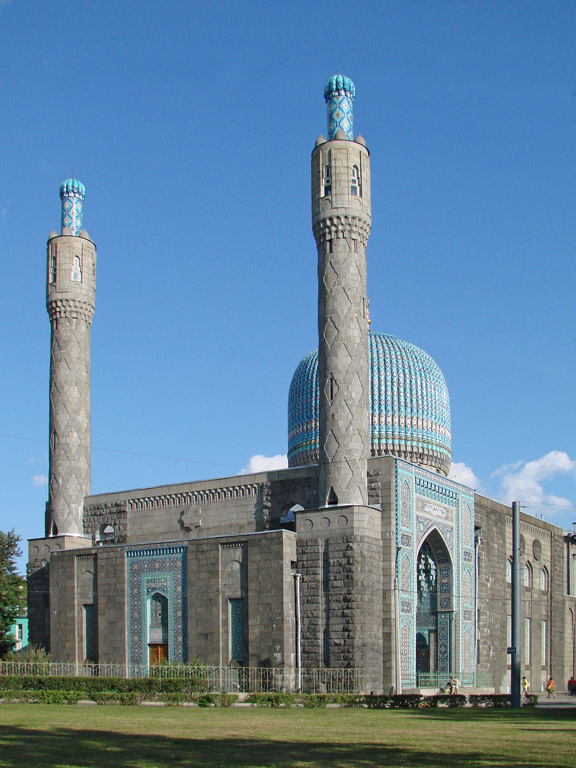
  Saint Petersburg Mosque

== Bibliography ==
- Николай Васильев От модерна к модернизму (in Russian).
- "Nicholas B. Vassilieve: Modernism in Flight".
- А. Ф. Бубырь Постройки в Петербурге (in Russian).
