= Tourism in Russia =

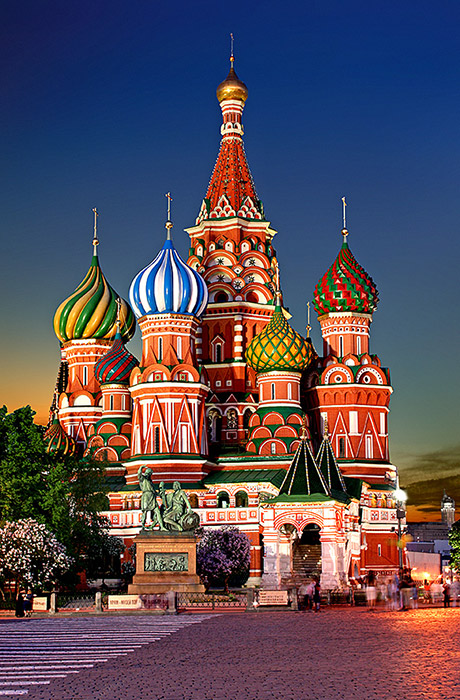
St. Basil's Cathedral in Red Square

Tourism in Russia represents 2.5% of the GDP of Russia. In 2024, foreign visitors to Russia for the purpose of tourism rose to 4.2 million, led by growth in visitors from China, the UAE, and Saudi Arabia.

Tourist routes include travel around the Golden Ring of Russia, cruises on the rivers including the Volga, and long journeys on the Trans-Siberian Railway.

Russian cuisine, Russian people, Maslenitsa, Tatars, Sabantuy, Siberia, and shamanist rituals are popular with tourists.

== Tourist destinations ==
=== Culture ===
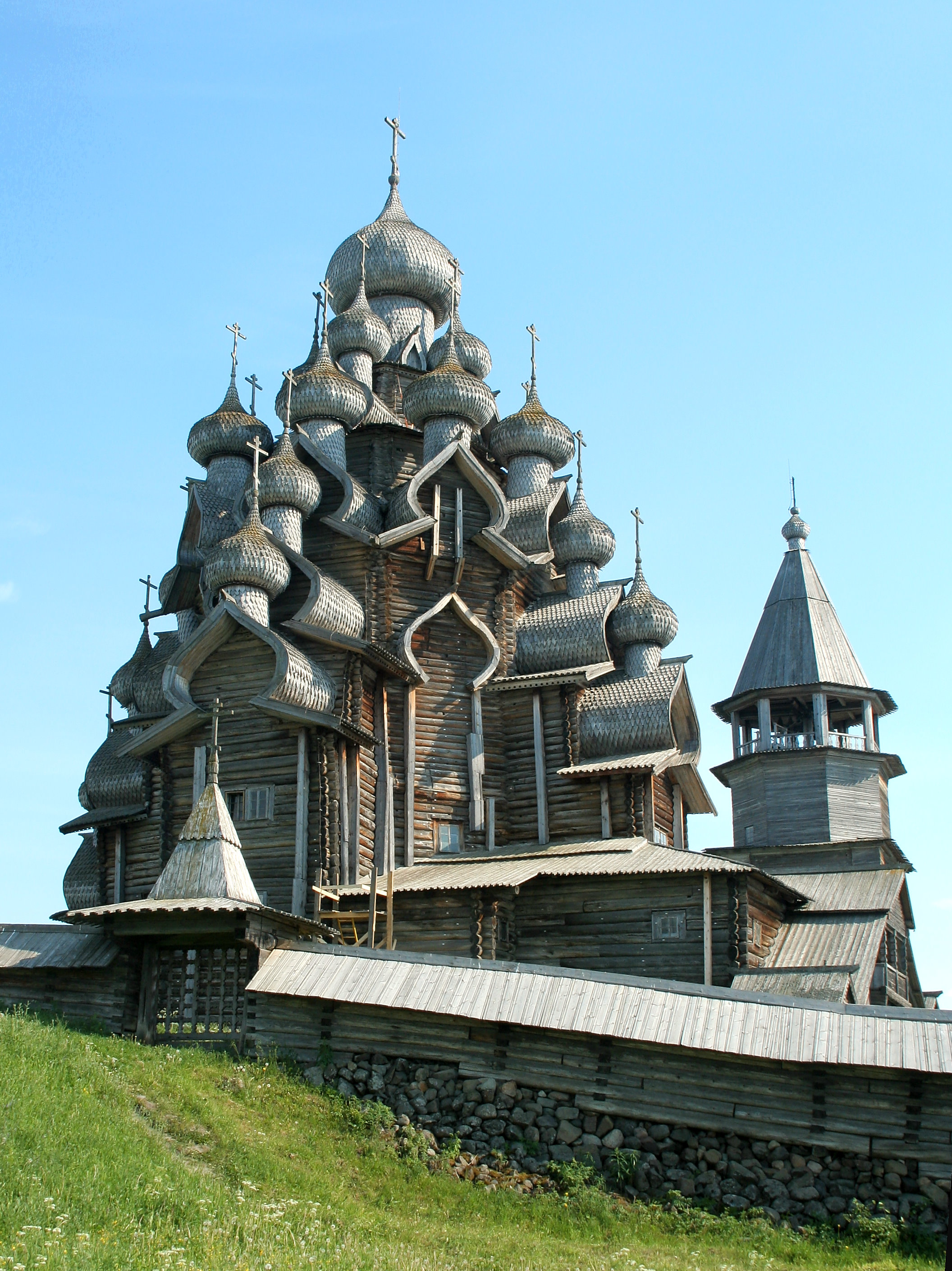
Kizhi in north-west Russia

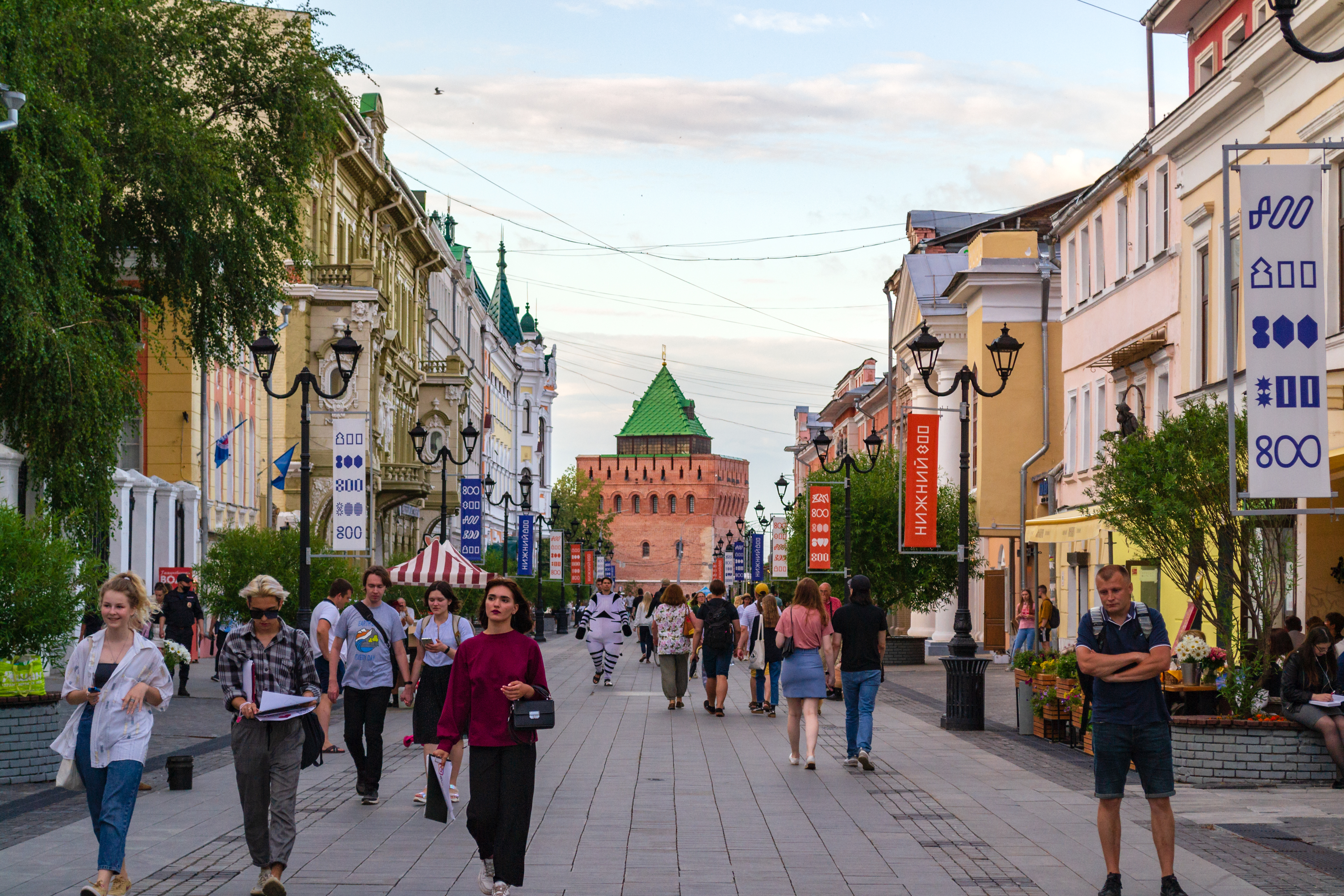
Bolshaya Pokrovskaya Street in Nizhny Novgorod

Not including Crimea, the country has 23 sites on the List of World Heritage Sites in Russia by UNESCO.

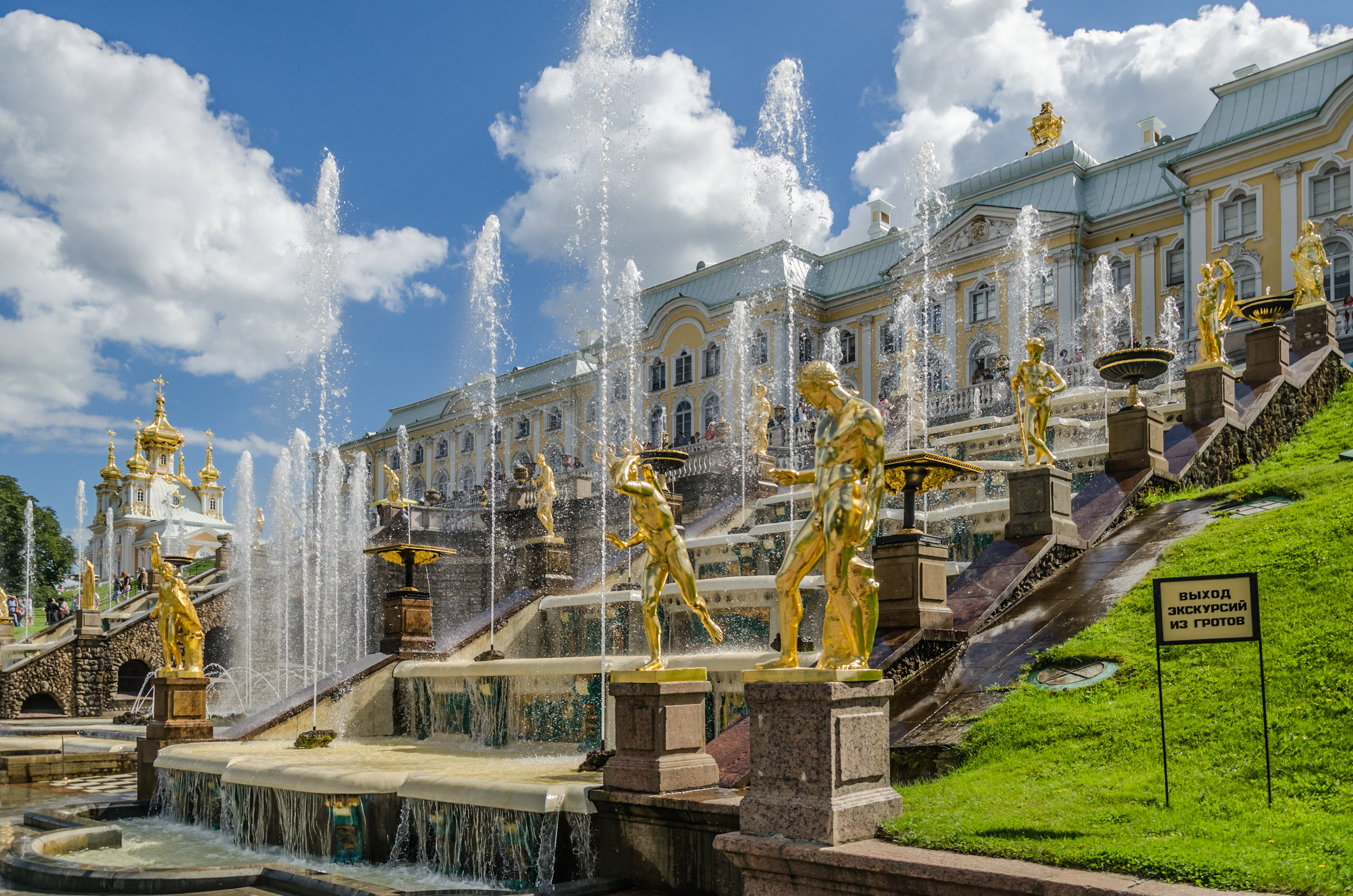
Grand Cascade in Peterhof in Saint Petersburg

Tourist destinations in Russia include Saint Petersburg (which appeared in the list of top visited cities of Europe in 2010) and Moscow, the current and the former capitals of the country. Moscow and Saint Petersburg museums such as Hermitage and Tretyakov Gallery, theaters including Bolshoi and Mariinsky, churches such as Saint Basil's Cathedral, Cathedral of Christ the Saviour, Saint Isaac's Cathedral and Church of the Savior on Blood, fortifications such as the Kremlin and Peter and Paul Fortress, squares such as Red Square and Palace Square, and streets such as Tverskaya and Nevsky Prospect. Palaces and parks are found in the former imperial residences in the suburbs of Moscow (Kolomenskoye, Tsaritsyno) and Saint Petersburg (Peterhof, Strelna, Oranienbaum, Gatchina, Pavlovsk Palace, Tsarskoye Selo). Moscow contains Soviet-era buildings along with the Moscow International Business Center. Saint Petersburg has classical architecture, rivers, channels and bridges.

Nizhny Novgorod is the capital of the Volga region. Nizhny Novgorod is divided into two parts by the Oka River. The Upper City is its historical part. The Lower City is its industrial and commercial part. Here are the Fair, the old Sormovo and Kanavino, GAZ and Sotsgorod (the so-called "city in the city"), the railway terminal, and the airport.

Kazan, the capital of Tatarstan, shows a mix of Christian Russian and Muslim Tatar cultures.

Sakha Republic proposes to use former forced labour camps as a tourist attraction. Tourists visit places of Communist crimes, e.g., of the Katyn massacre and Solovetsky Islands.

==== Museums ====
Russia is home to museums that include the Tretyakov Gallery, the Kremlin Armoury and the State Historical Museum in Moscow, the Hermitage Museum, and the Russian Museum in St Petersburg, the Kazan Kremlin in Kazan, etc. Russia has museums related to its literary and classical music heritage, such as Yasnaya Polyana associated with Leo Tolstoy, the Mikhaylovskoye Museum Reserve associated with Alexander Pushkin, the Dostoyevsky Museum, the Tchaikovsky State House-Museum, and the Rimsky-Korsakov Apartment and Museum.

Museums related to Russia's military history and military hardware include the Central Museum of the Great Patriotic War on Poklonnaya Hill, the Central Naval Museum in St Petersburg, the Battle of Stalingrad Museum in Volgograd. Museums related to science and technology include the Polytechnic Museum of Moscow, and the Memorial Museum of Cosmonautics.

The GULAG History Museum tells the story about the GULAG camps in Siberia.

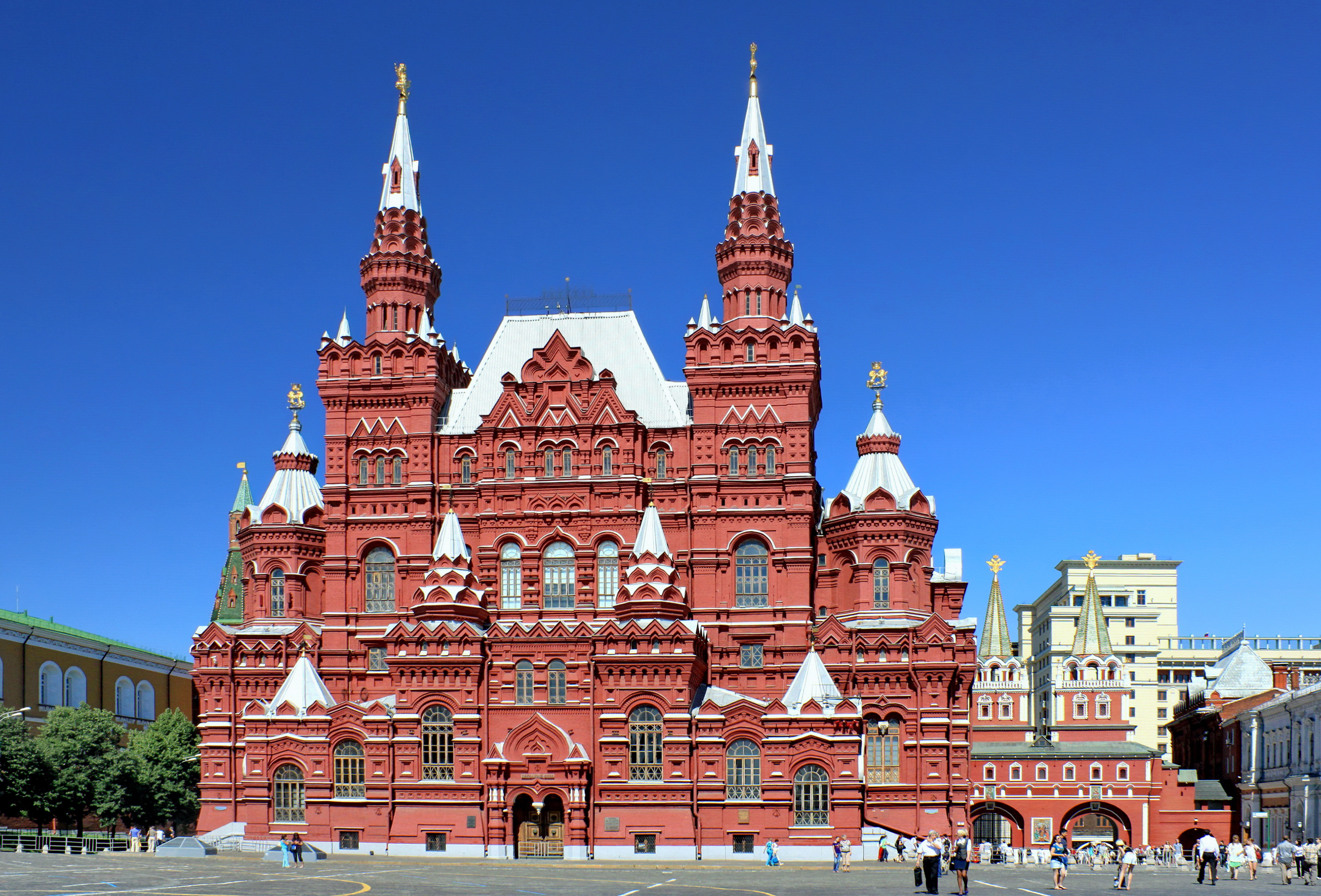
The State Historical Museum

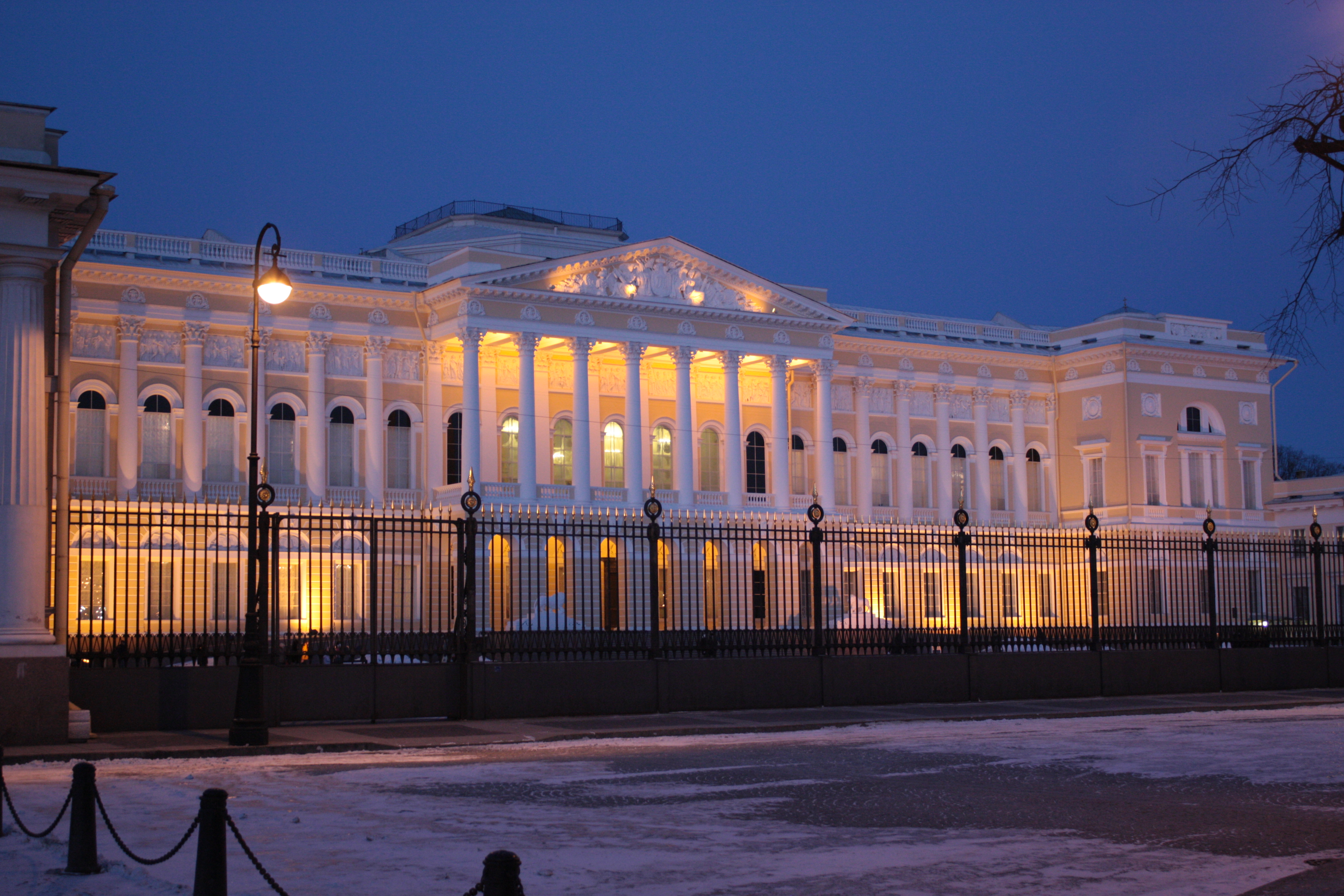
Russian Museum

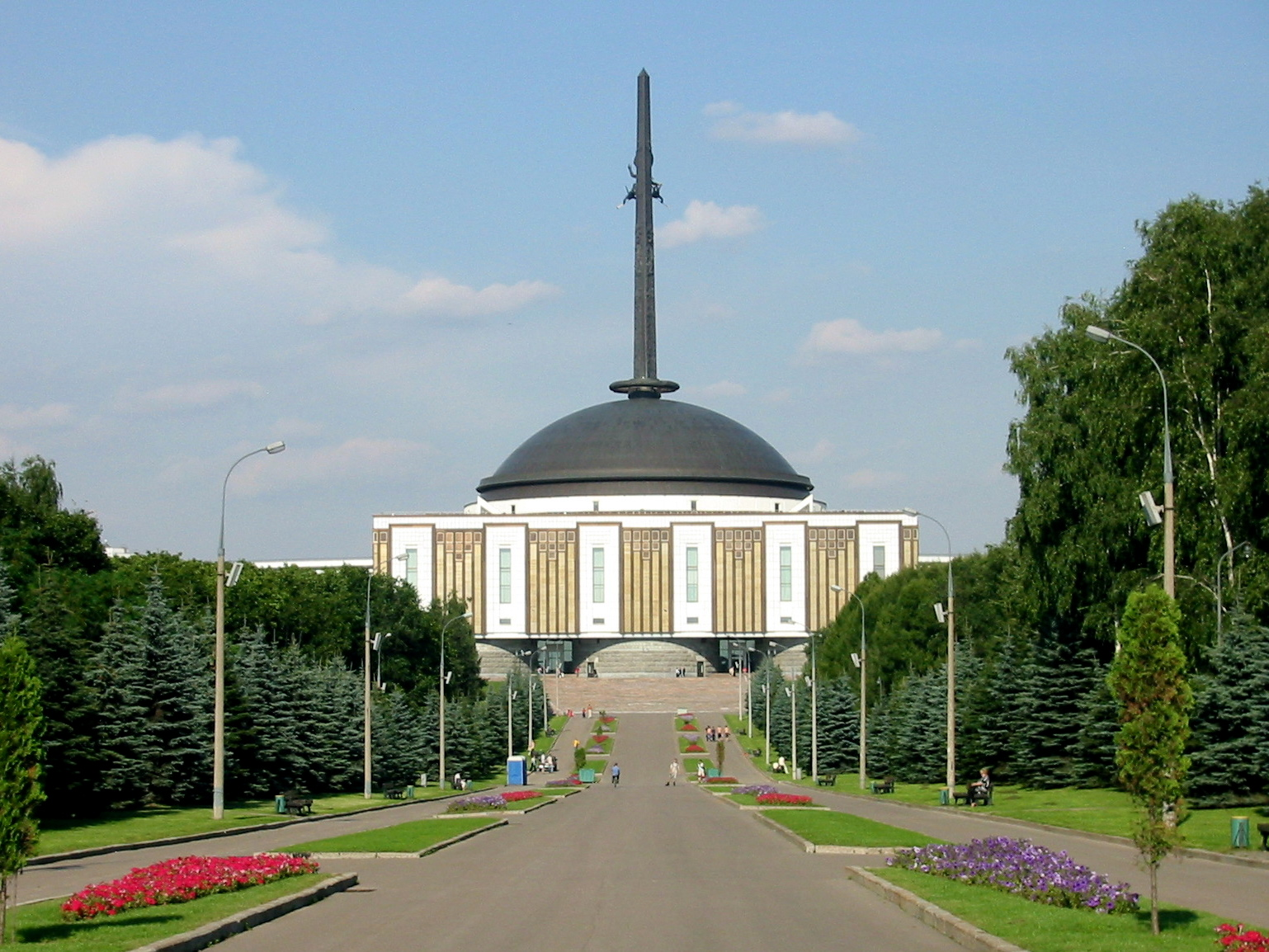
Museum of the Great Patriotic War, Moscow

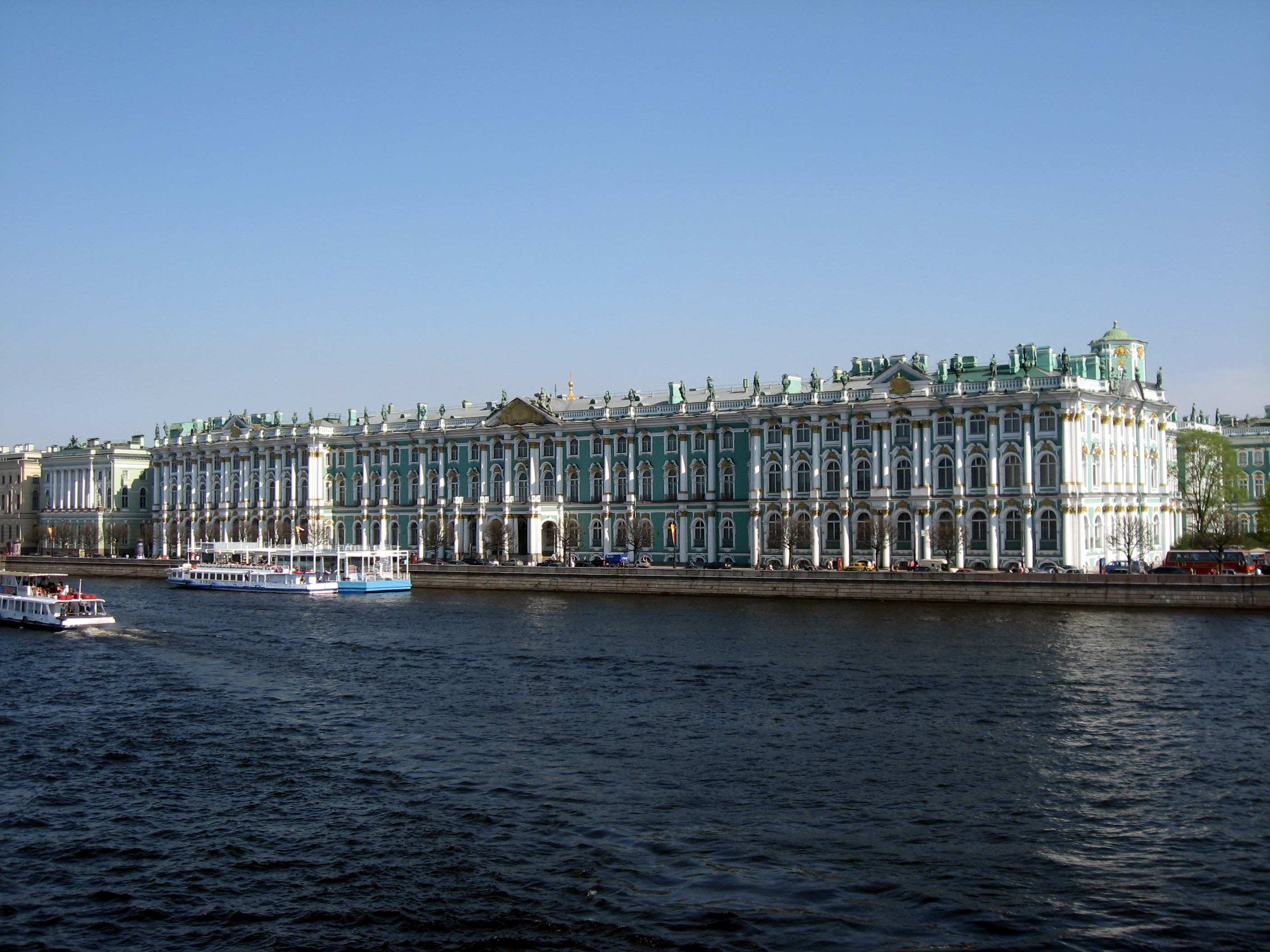
The Hermitage Museum

=== Nature ===
In Russia, Nature Reserves have history and it has its own word of definition Zapovedniks (Russian: заповедник, plural заповедники) more than 100 Nature Reserves exist in Russia and more than 50 National Parks.

National parks and sanctuaries of Russia include the Baikal Nature Reserve, the Altai Nature Reserve, the Lazovsky Nature Reserve, the Kedrovaya Pad Nature Reserve, the Curonian Spit National Park, the Valdaysky National Park, the Baikal-Lena Nature Reserve, the Ilmen Nature Reserve.

The Seven Wonders of Russia include Lake Baikal, Valley of Geysers, Manpupuner rock formations, Kizhi Island, and Mount Elbrus.

Other areas include Republic of Adygea where Fisht Mountain is located, Chechnya Republic where Lake Kezenoyam is located.

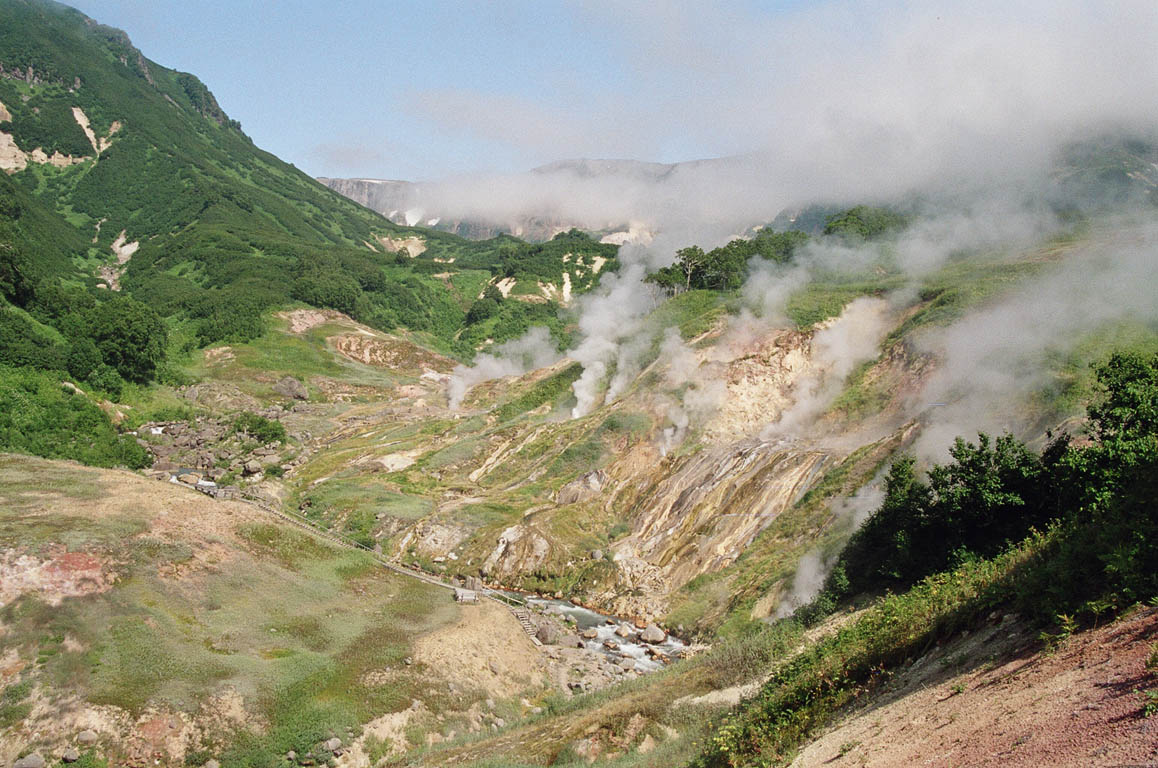
The Valley of Geysers in Kamchatka Peninsula

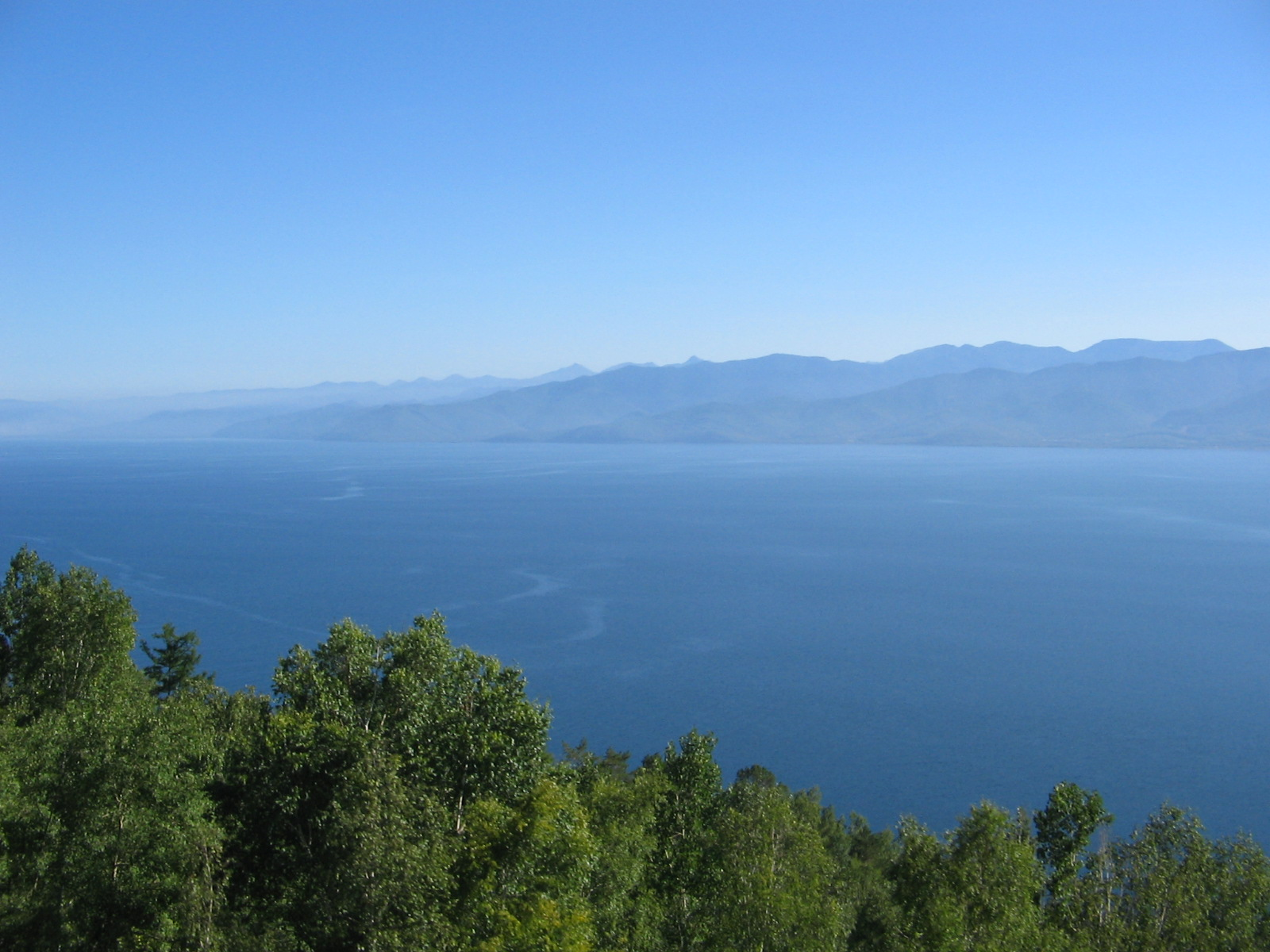
Lake Baikal, the deepest lake in the world and the biggest fresh-water lake by volume

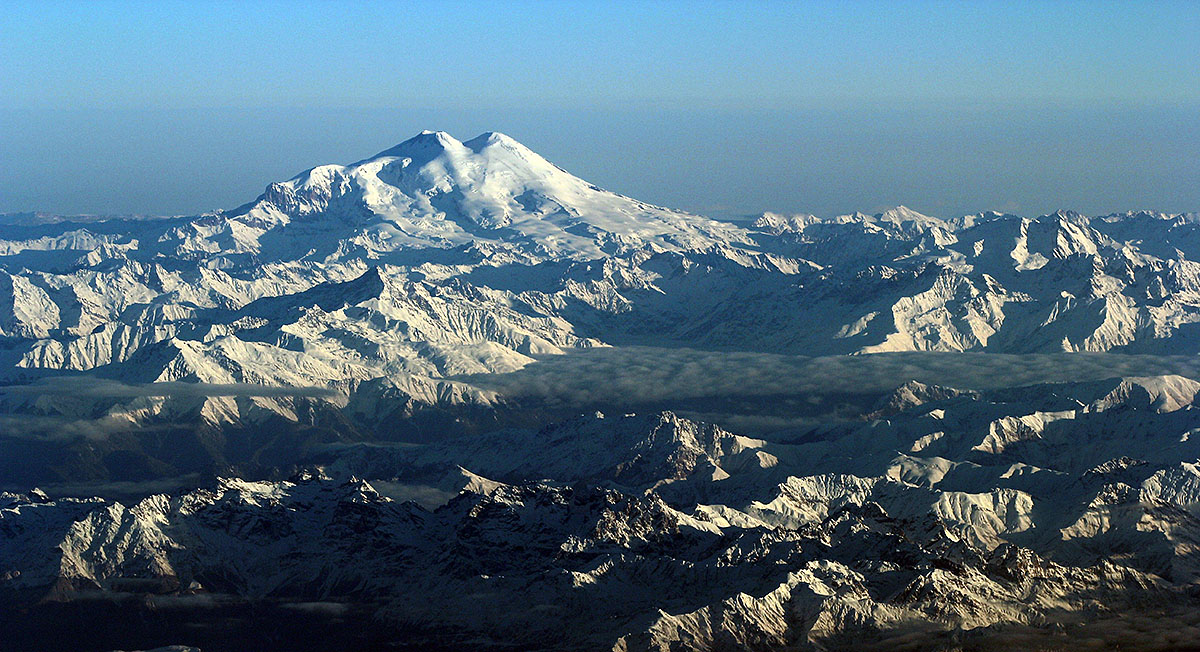
Mount Elbrus with its two peaks

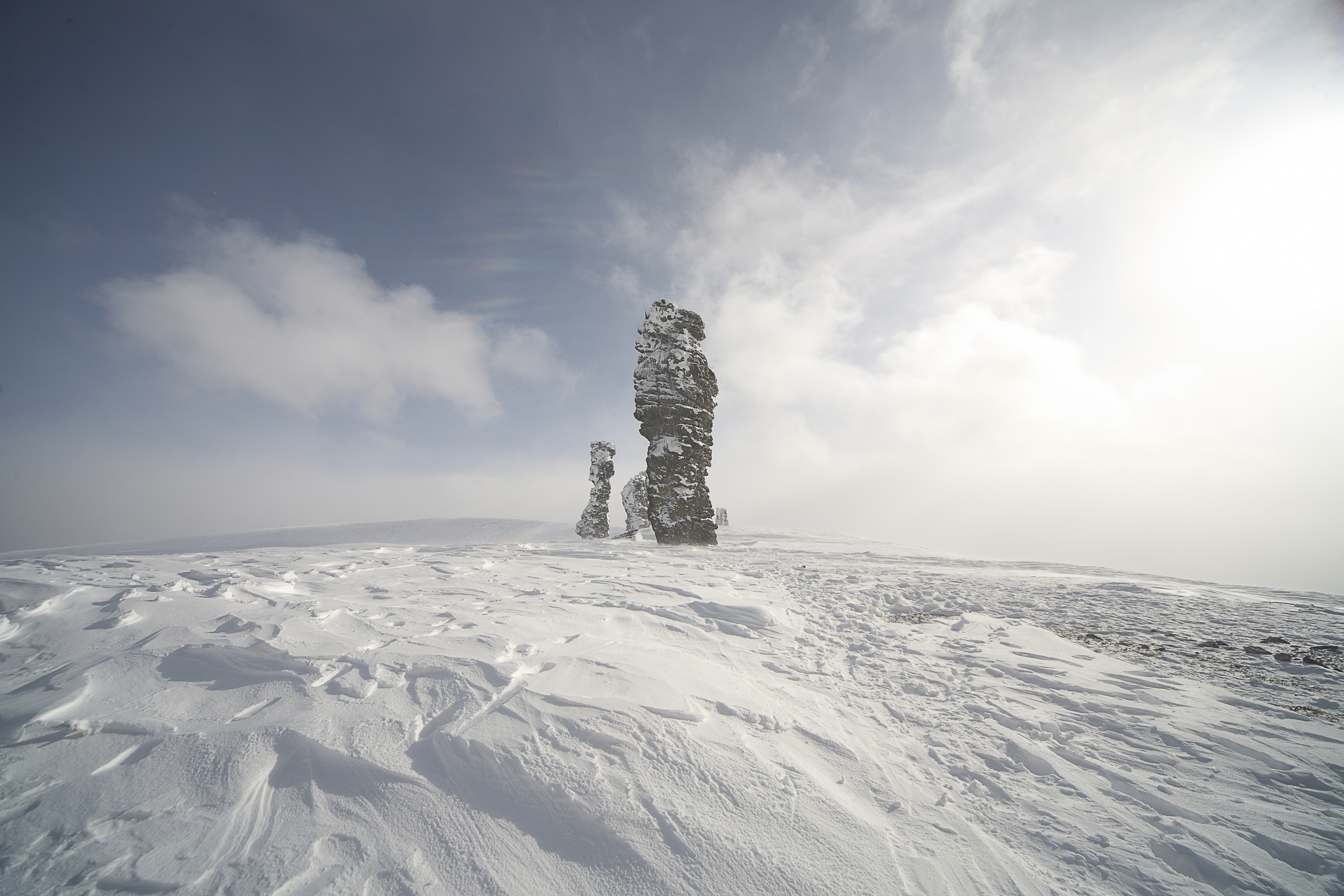
The Manpupuner rock formations

=== Spas ===
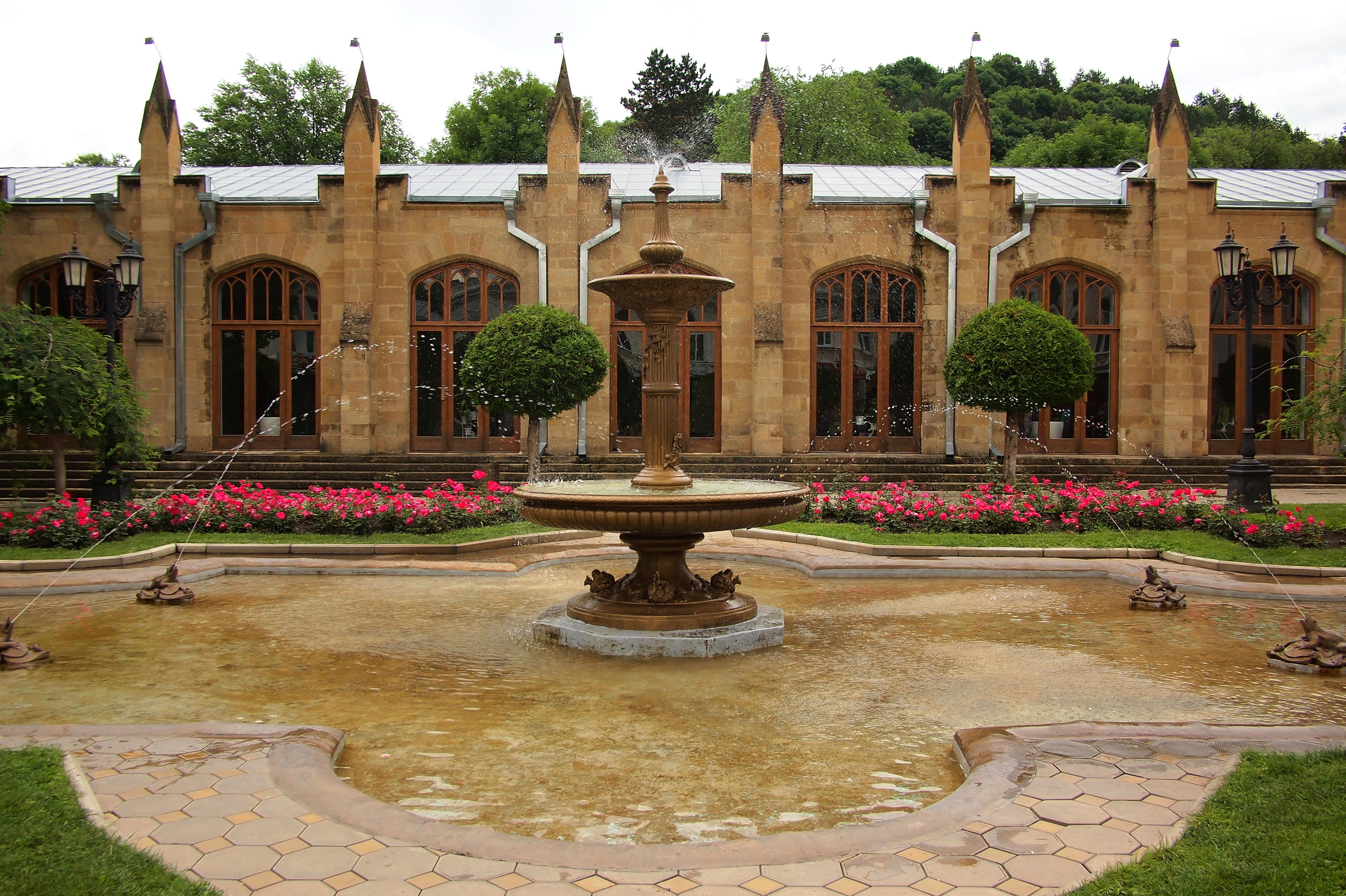
Narzan Gallery building in Kislovodsk housing a dozen fountains of both hot and cold mineral-rich water

Mineral spa resorts have been established across Russia in such regions as Kamchatka Krai, Altai Krai, Krasnodar Krai, Stavropol Krai, North Caucasus region of Russia. Some cities have natural hot spring water during winter and some of Russian cities are called Russian Spa town, including Pyatigorsk, Yessentuki, Kislovodsk, Zheleznovodsk and Mineralnye Vody; these towns are jointly known as the Caucasian Mineral Waters.

Russia has one of the largest water borders in world, but only the more Southern regions are suitable for resort tourism. The warm subtropical Black Sea coast of Russia is the site for some seaside resorts such as Sochi and Tuapse.

=== Sports ===
A vast part of Russian territory is in Subarctic climate and humid continental climate, and that is why it is cold. In addition, Russia is mountainous in regions like Northern Caucasus, Altai Krai and Kamchatka Peninsula. The highest peak in Europe, Mount Elbrus, is in Russia, which makes Russia a place for winter sports. Ski resorts are in Russia. A ski resort in Russia is Sochi and its Krasnaya Polyana. Other ski resorts in Russia are Dombay in Karachay–Cherkessia in Northern Caucasus.

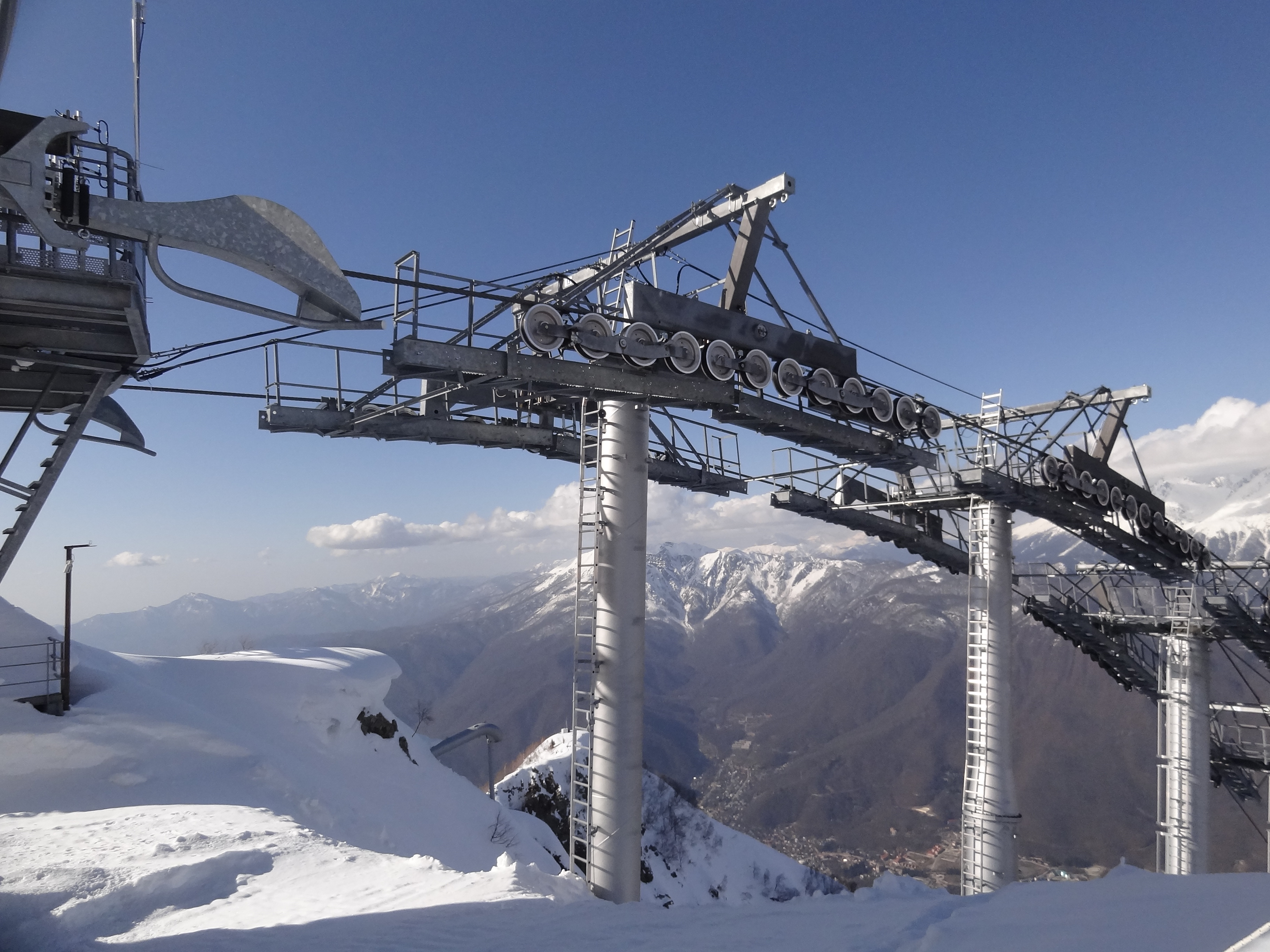
The Gornaya Karusel in Sochi

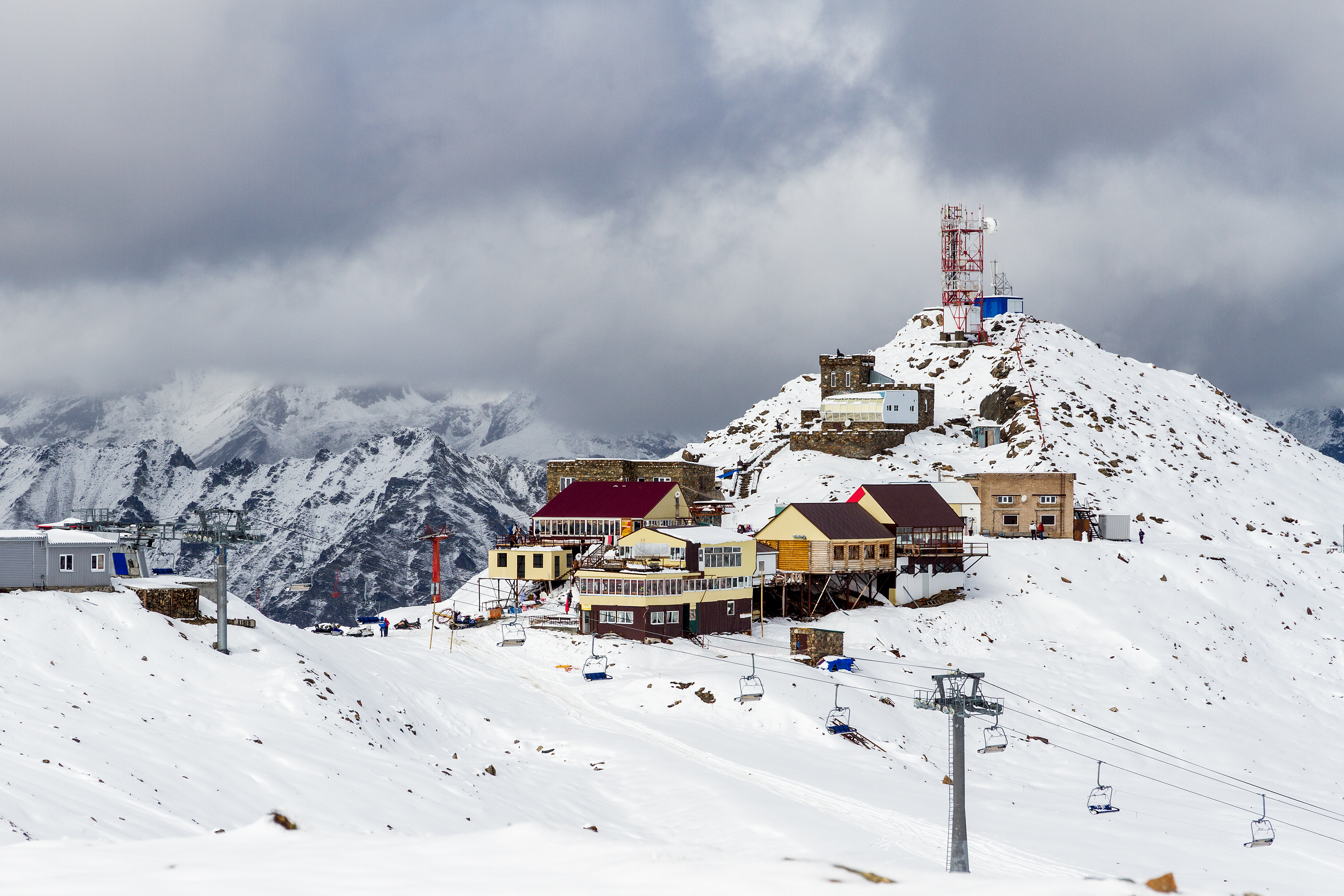
Dombay

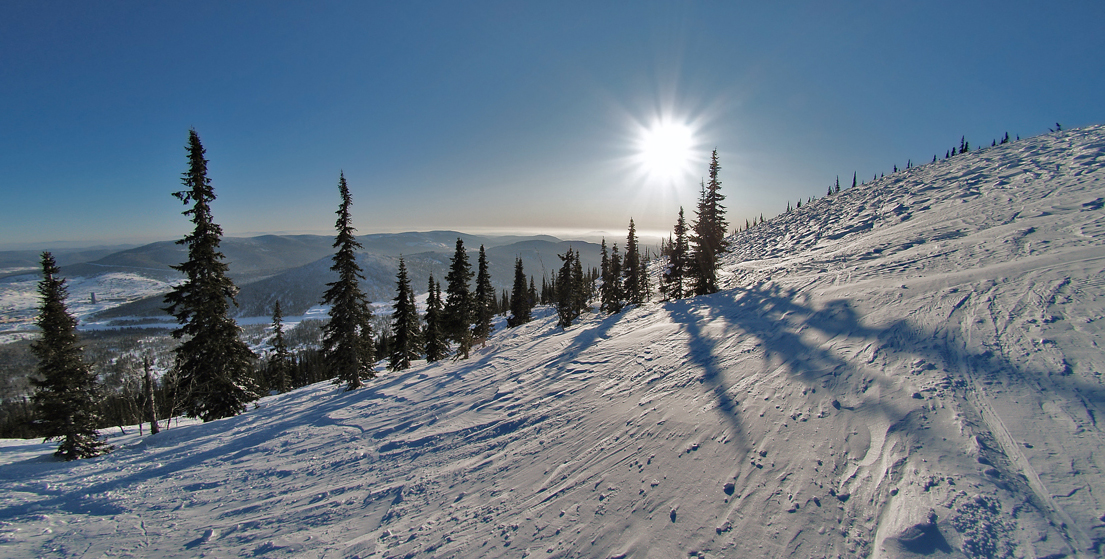
The Sheregesh in Kemerovo Oblast

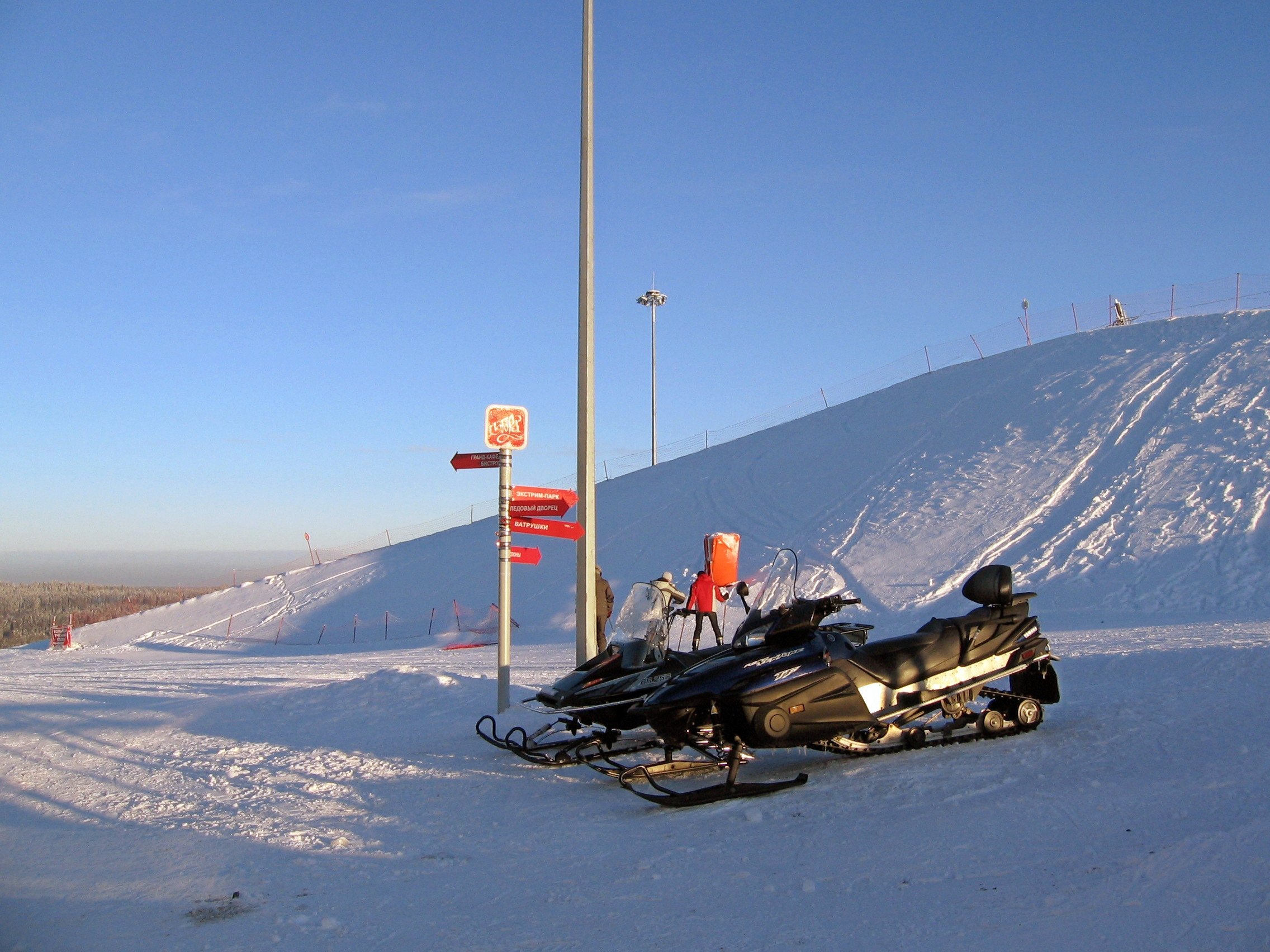
Igora ski resort

=== Medical tourism ===
Russia is a destination for medical tourism. A factor in its popularity was the relatively weak ruble post-2014, which saw the industry grow from some 110,000 clients in 2017 to some 728,000 clients in the first five months of 2020. Stomatology is the most used (44% of patients), genecology and urology follow (25% taken together), the other services are plastic surgery (10%), ophthalmology (10%), and cardiology (5%). Most clients come from the CIS states, where receiving high-tech medical assistance can be problematic, particularly from Central Asia, which amounts for 62% of all patients; but also from Eastern Europe (32%), South and East Asia (5%). In addition to price and accessibility of complex manipulations, the difference in regulations between Russia and the clients' own nations is a driving factor for receiving care in Russia: for instance, in vitro fertilization is illegal in China, but legal in Russia.

=== Religious tourism ===
Religious tourism has two main subtypes: pilgrimage, as travel done for religious or spiritual purposes, and the viewing of religious monuments and artefacts for sightseeing. The former is relatively insignificant for the Russian tourism industry, amounting for approximately 100 thousands pilgrims yearly. The latter is more important. Orthodox Christianity being the most common religion in Russia, it also accounts for most religious monuments across the country.

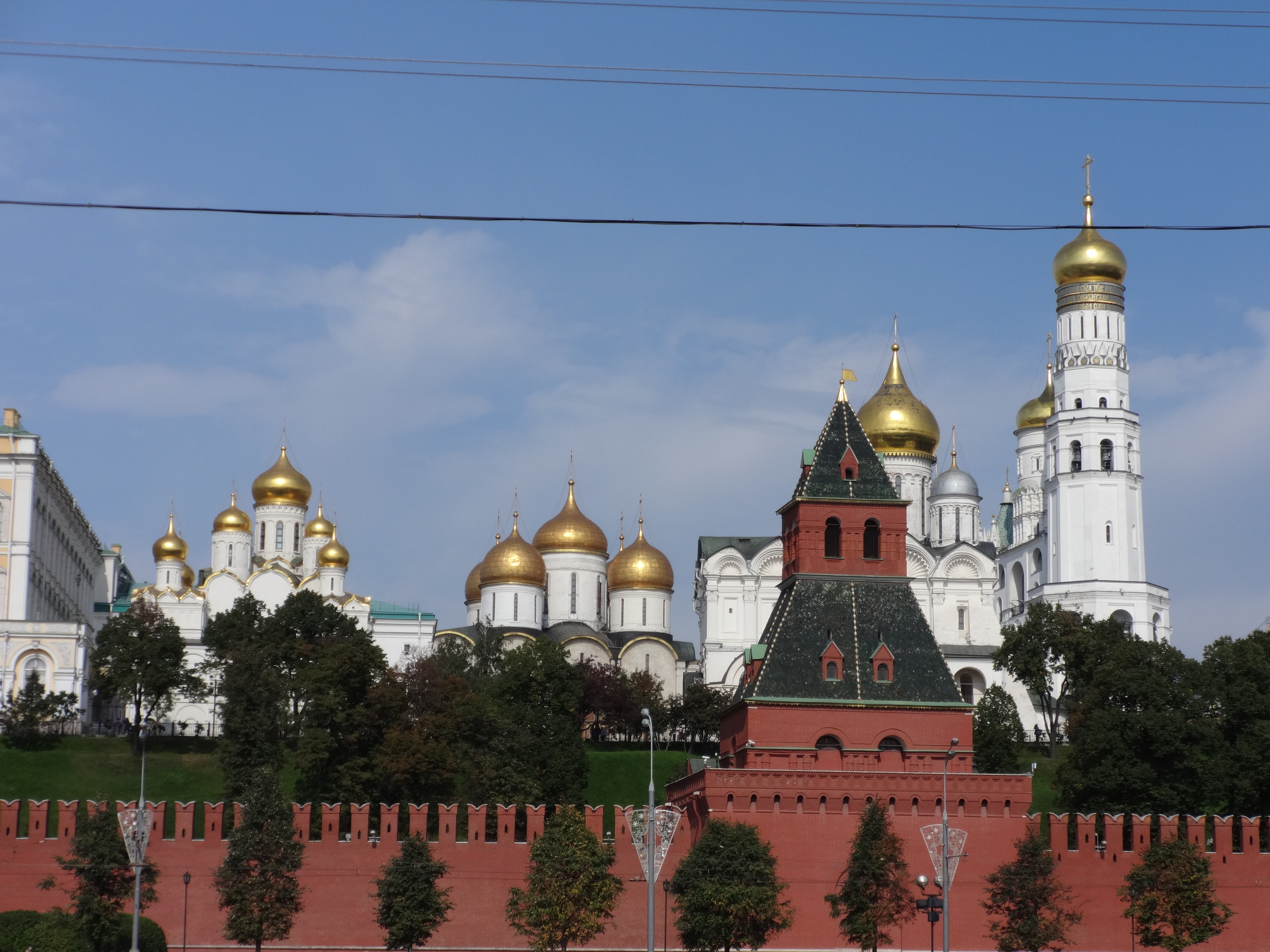
Domes of Sobornaya Square in Moscow Kremlin

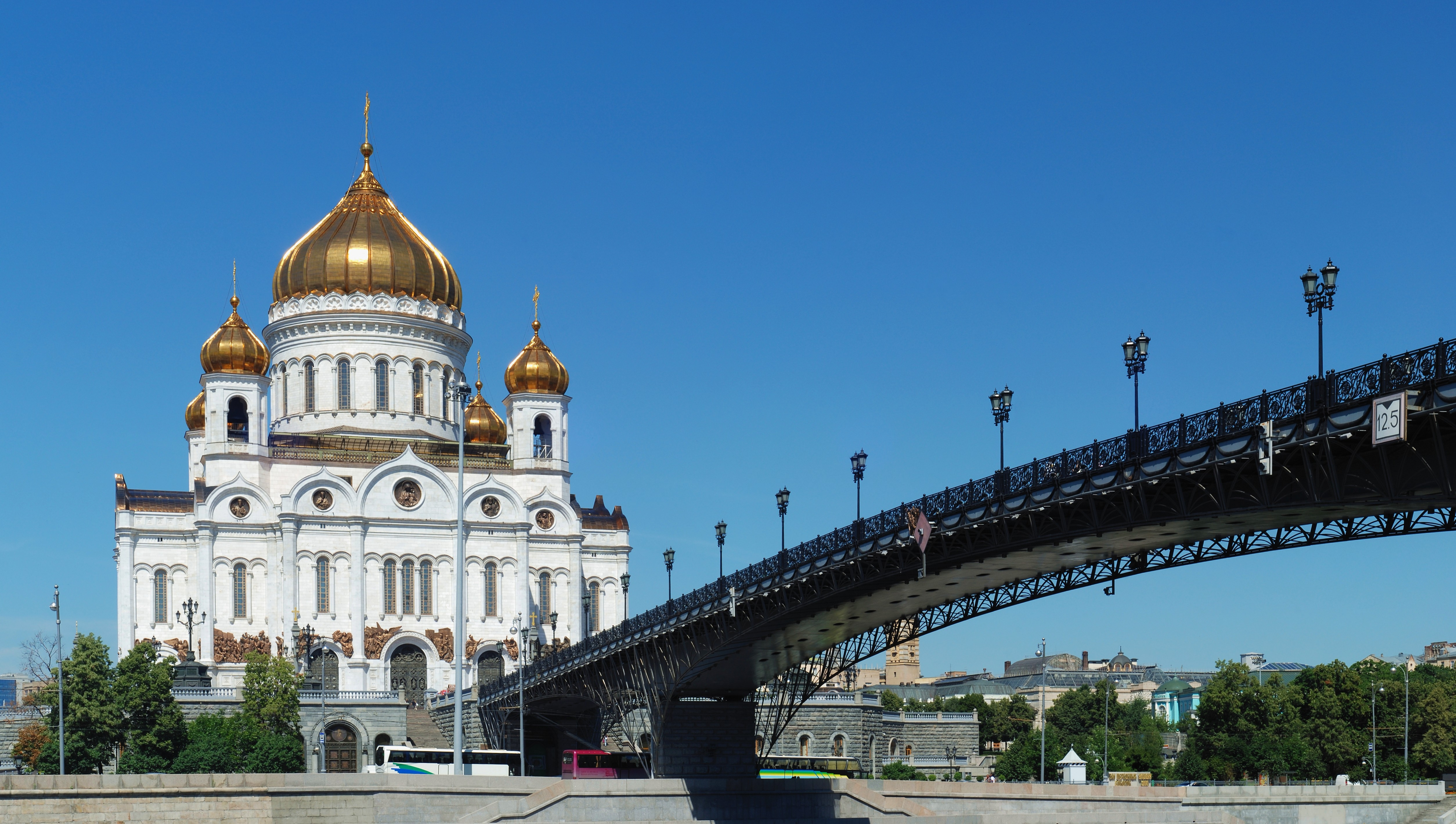
The Cathedral of Christ the Saviour

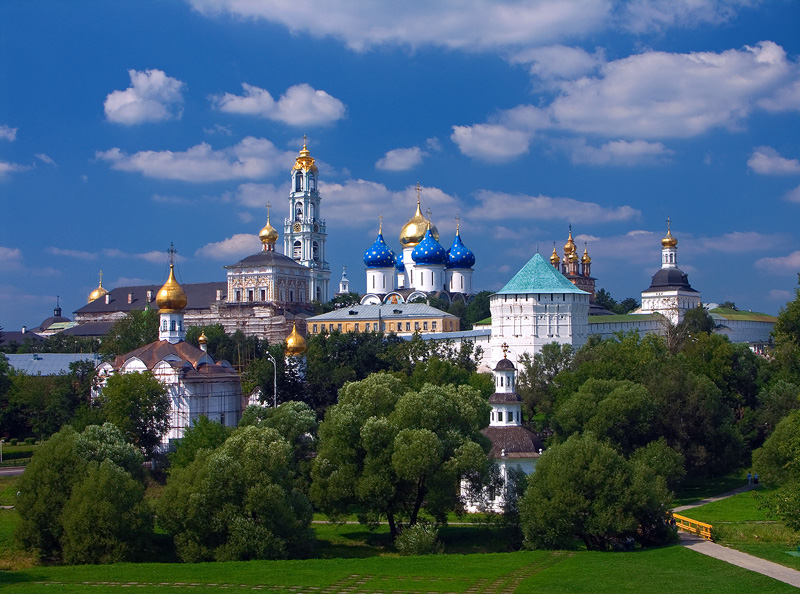
The Trinity Lavra of St. Sergius

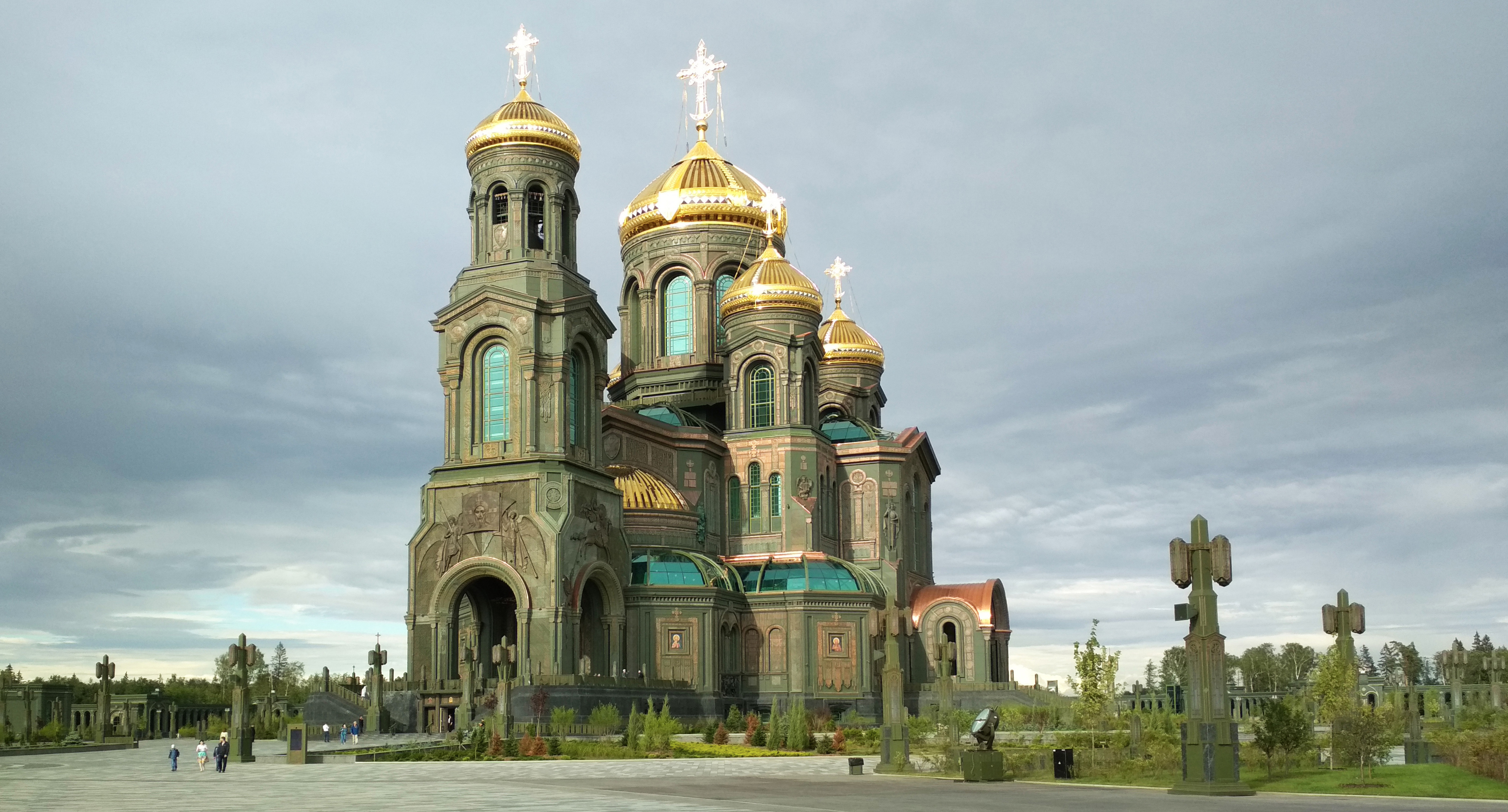
The Main Cathedral of the Russian Armed Forces

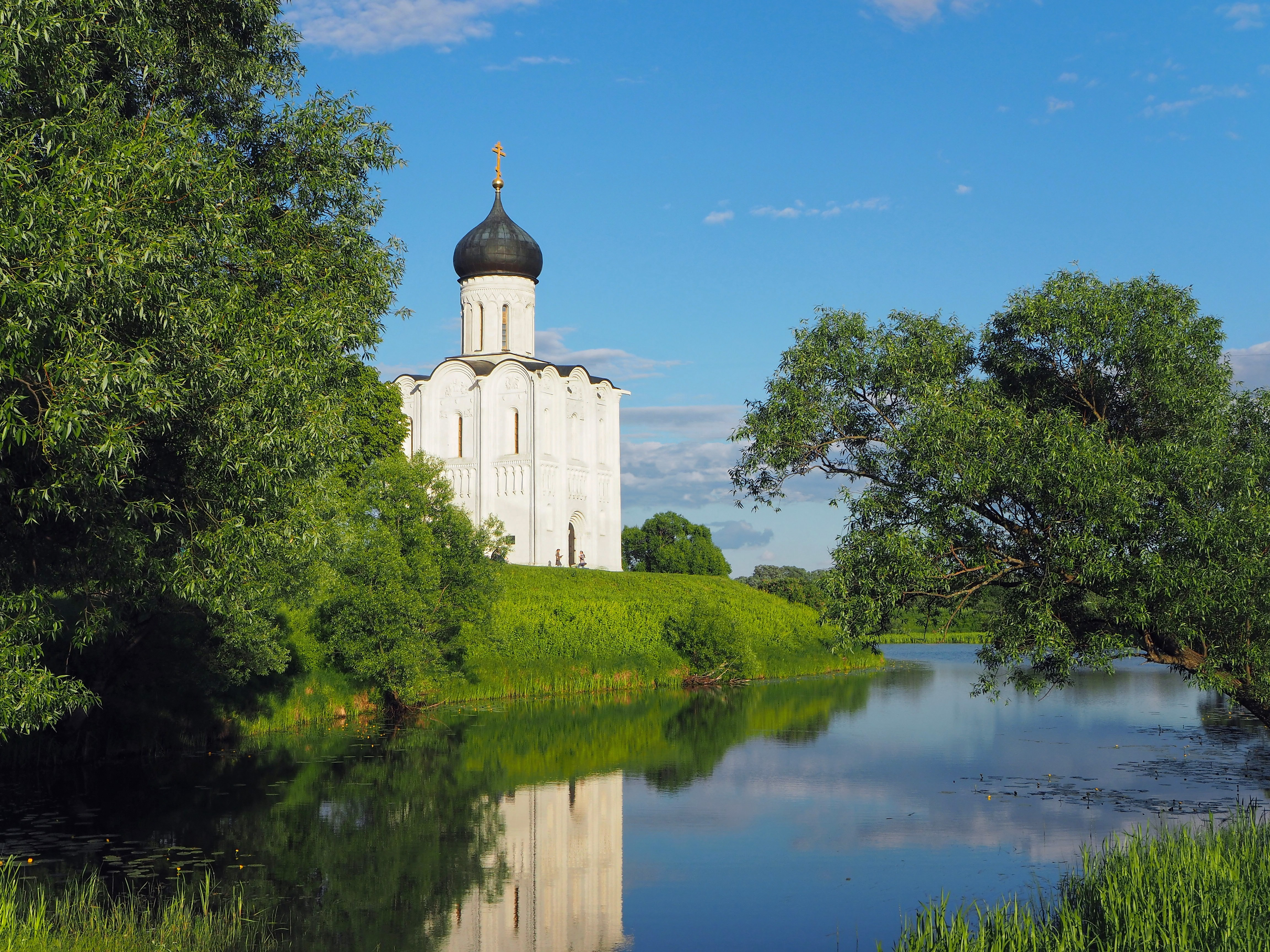
The Church of the Intercession on the Nerl

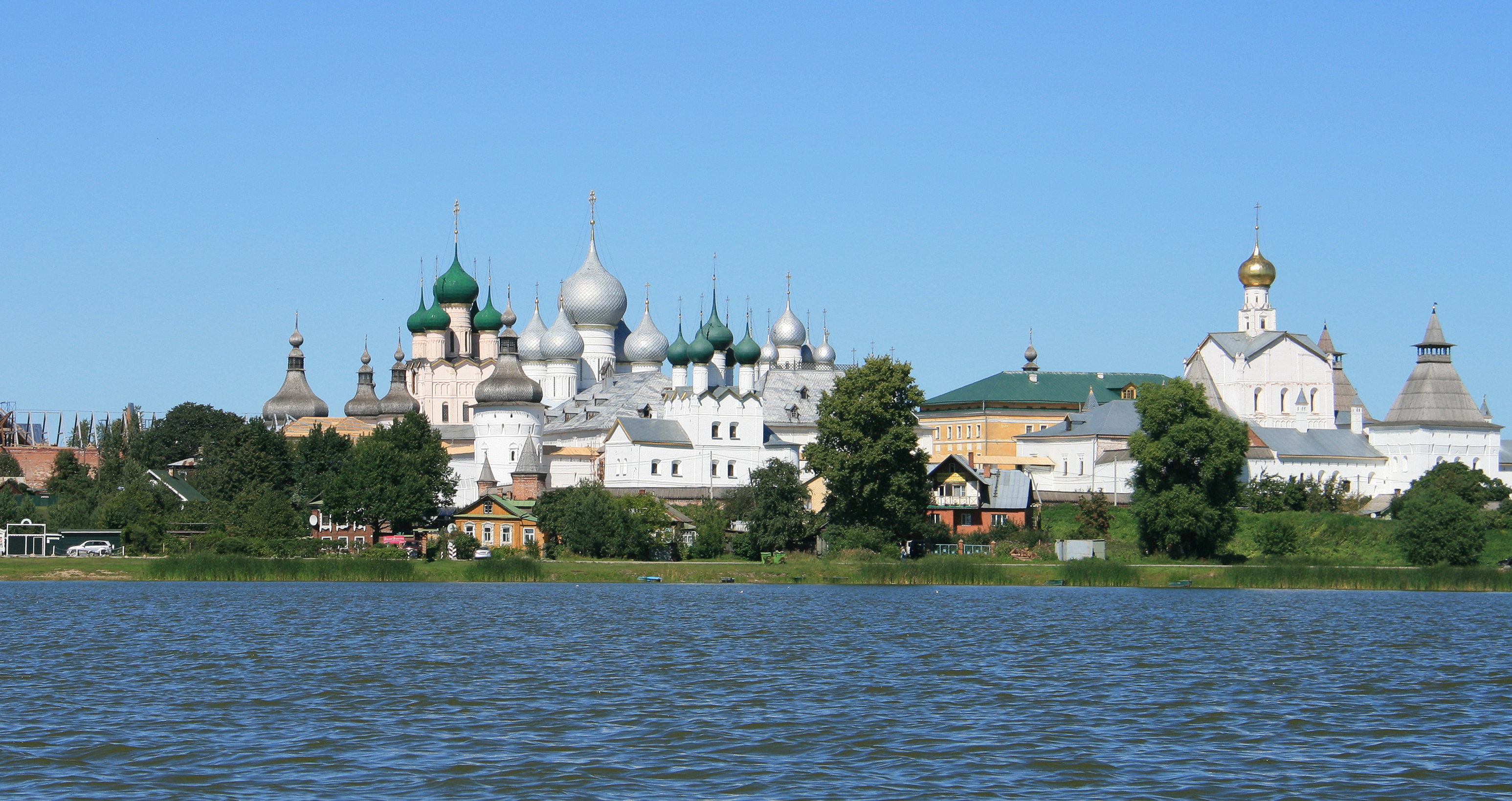
Rostov Kremlin

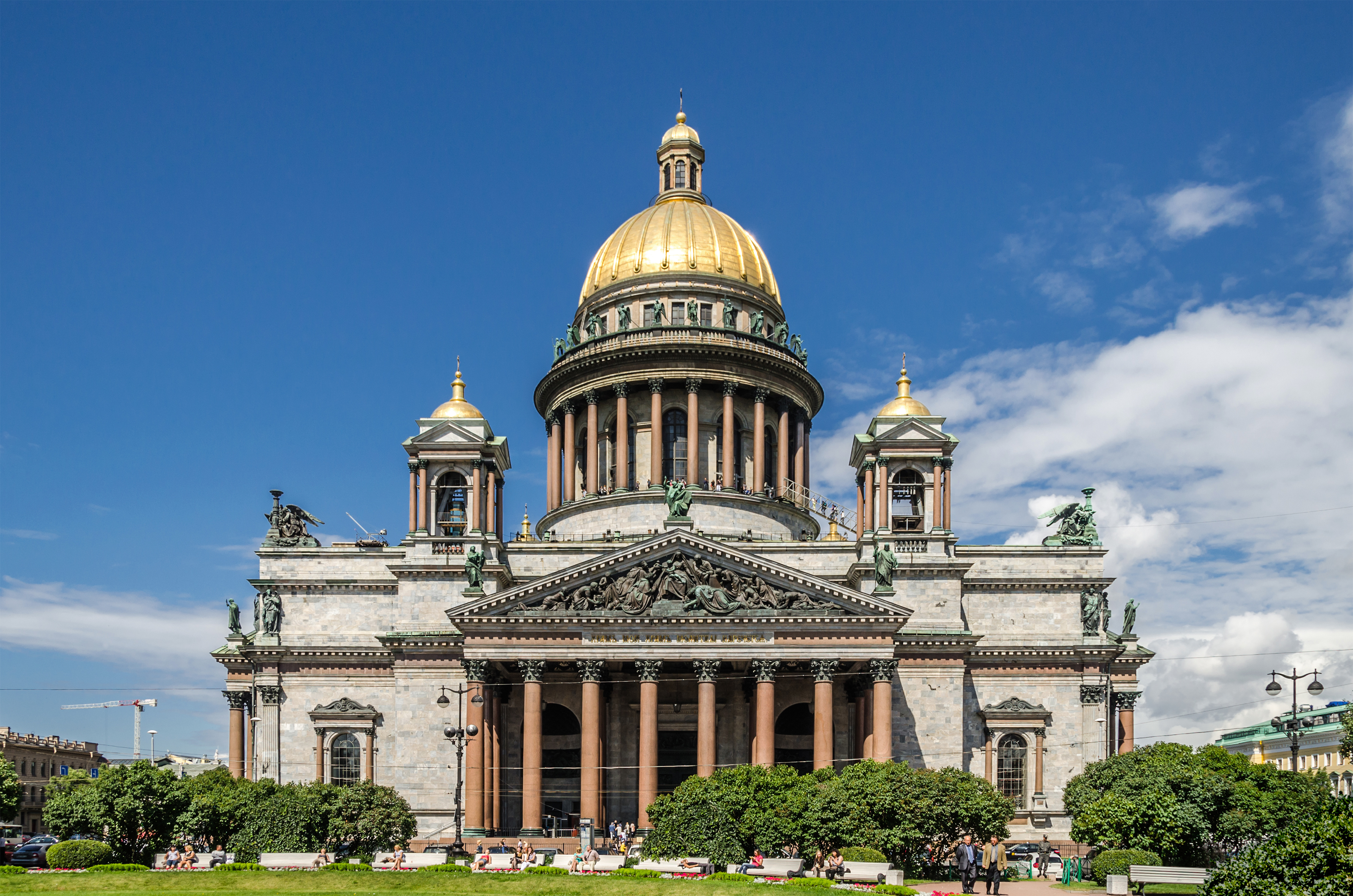
Saint Isaac's Cathedral

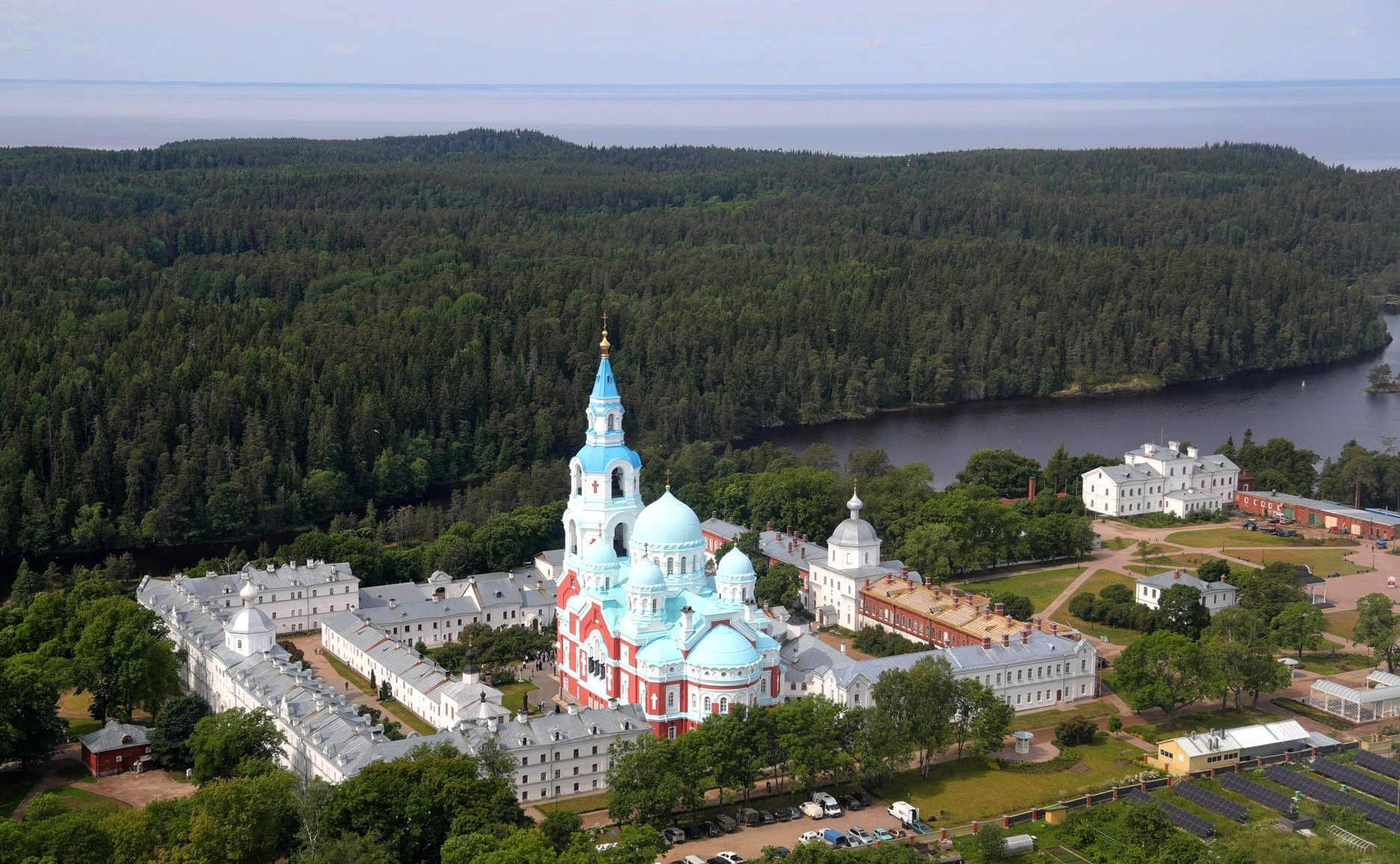
The Valaam Monastery

Multiple pieces of Islamic religious architectural art are scattered across the country, from mosques to maqāms. They are mostly clustered in the historically Muslim regions.

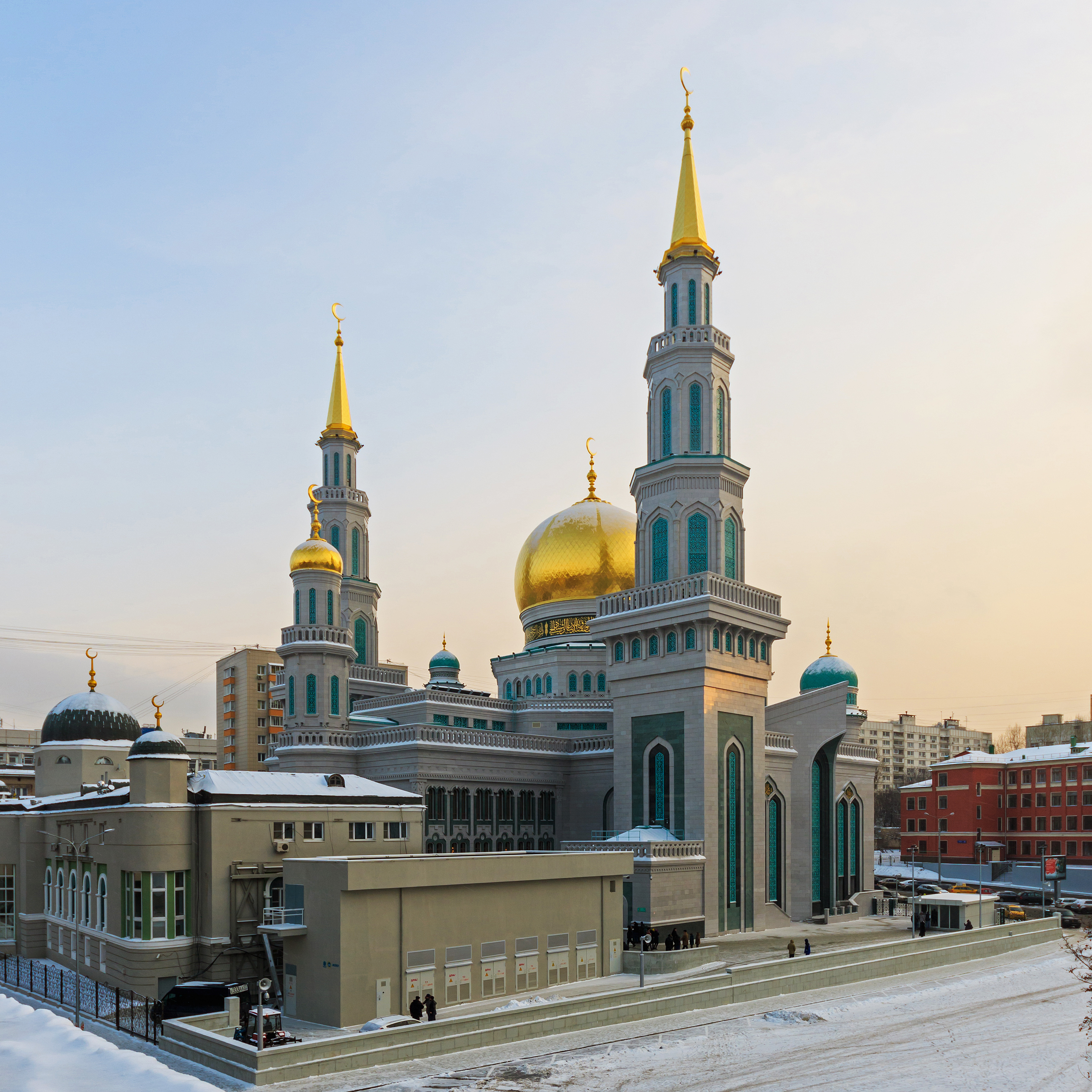
Moscow Cathedral Mosque

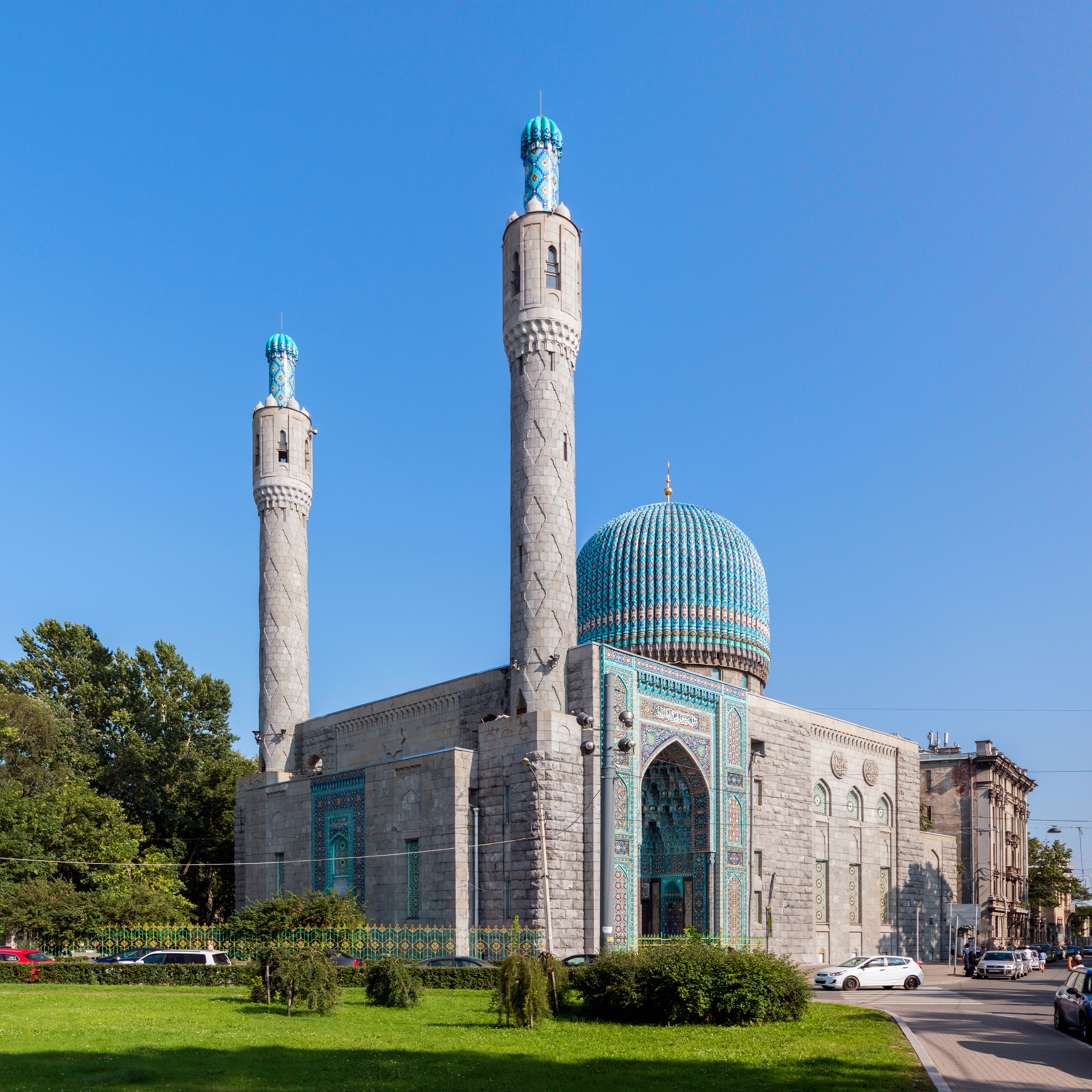
The Saint Petersburg Mosque

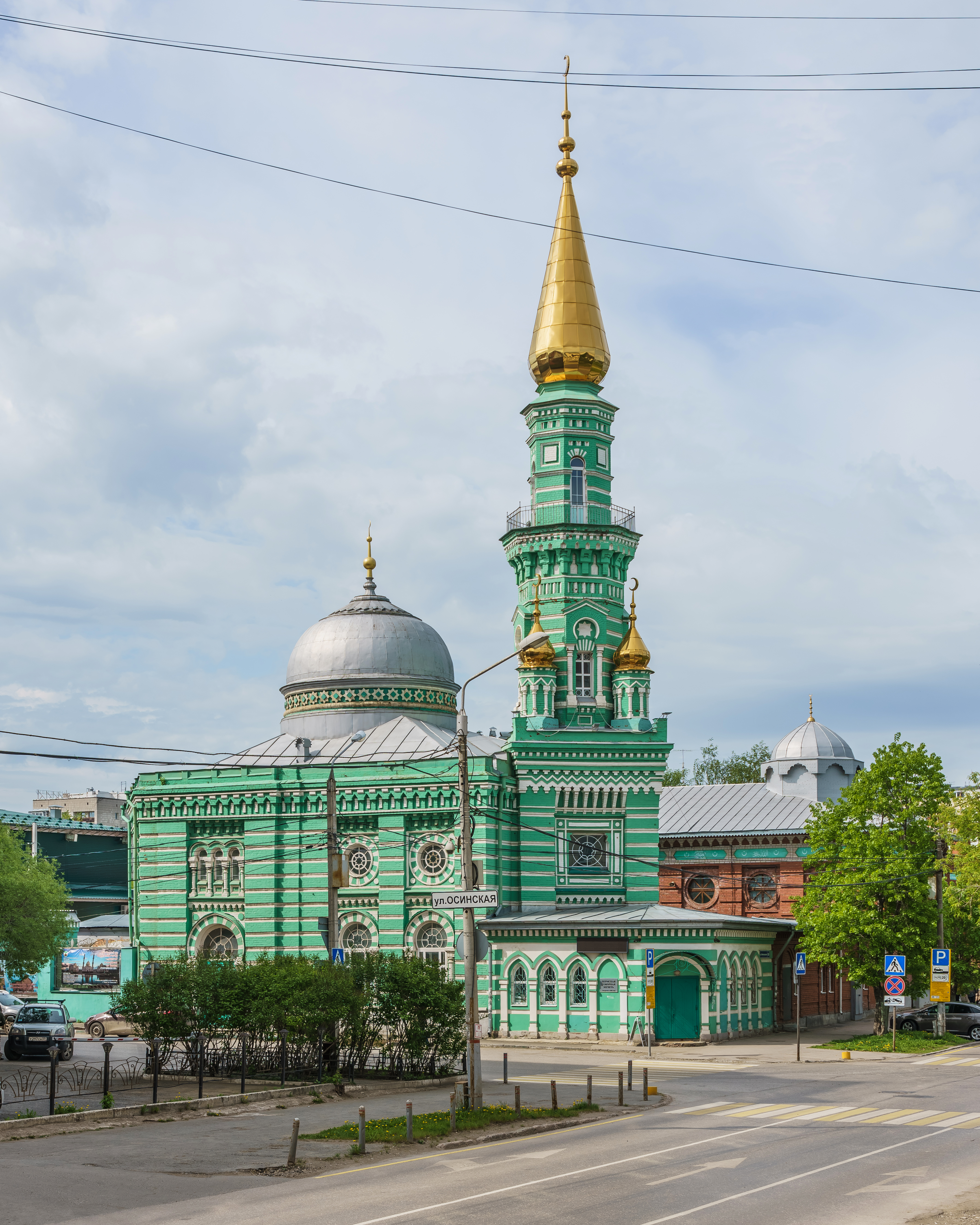
Perm Mosque

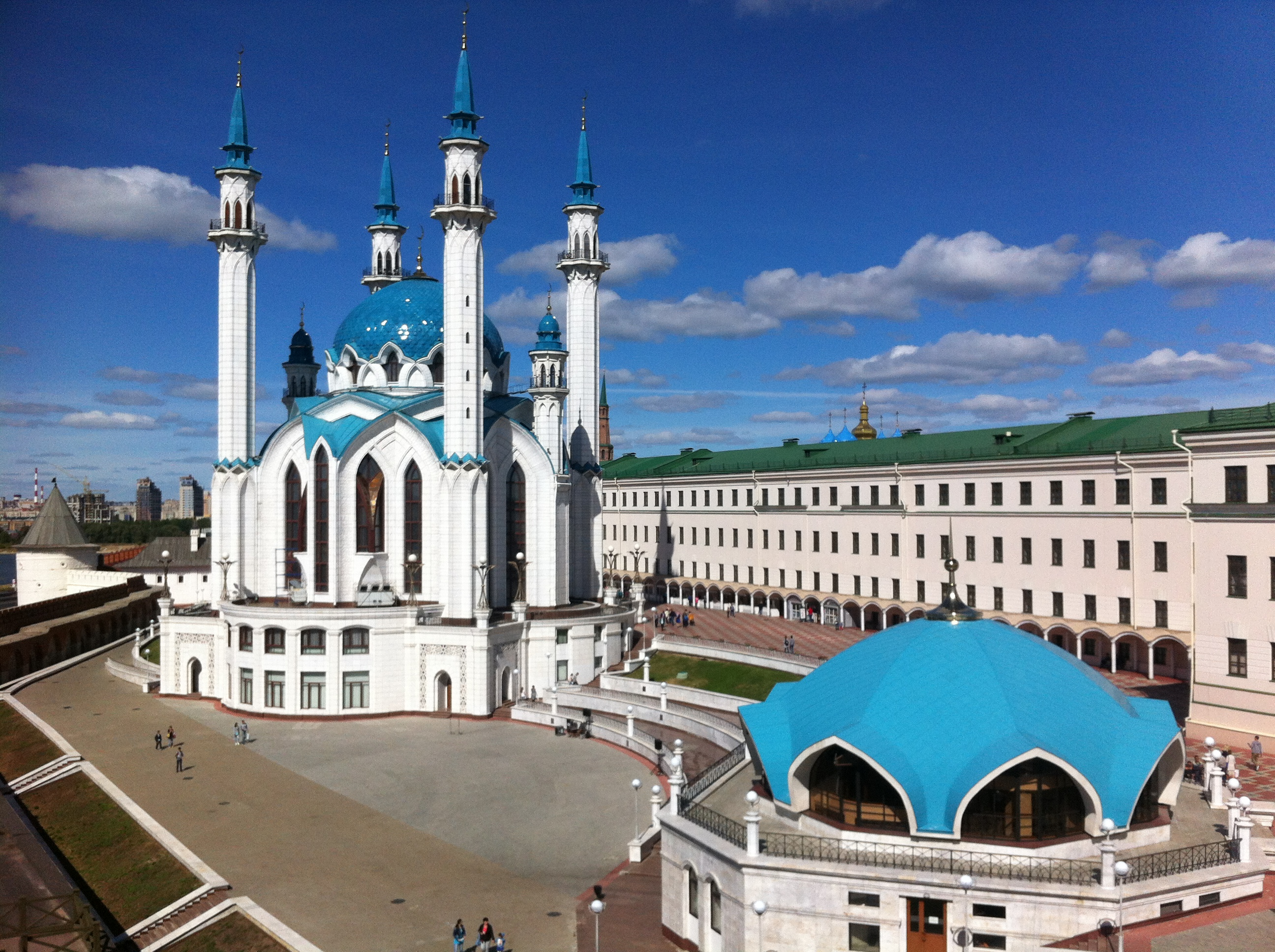
The Kul Sharif Mosque in Kazan

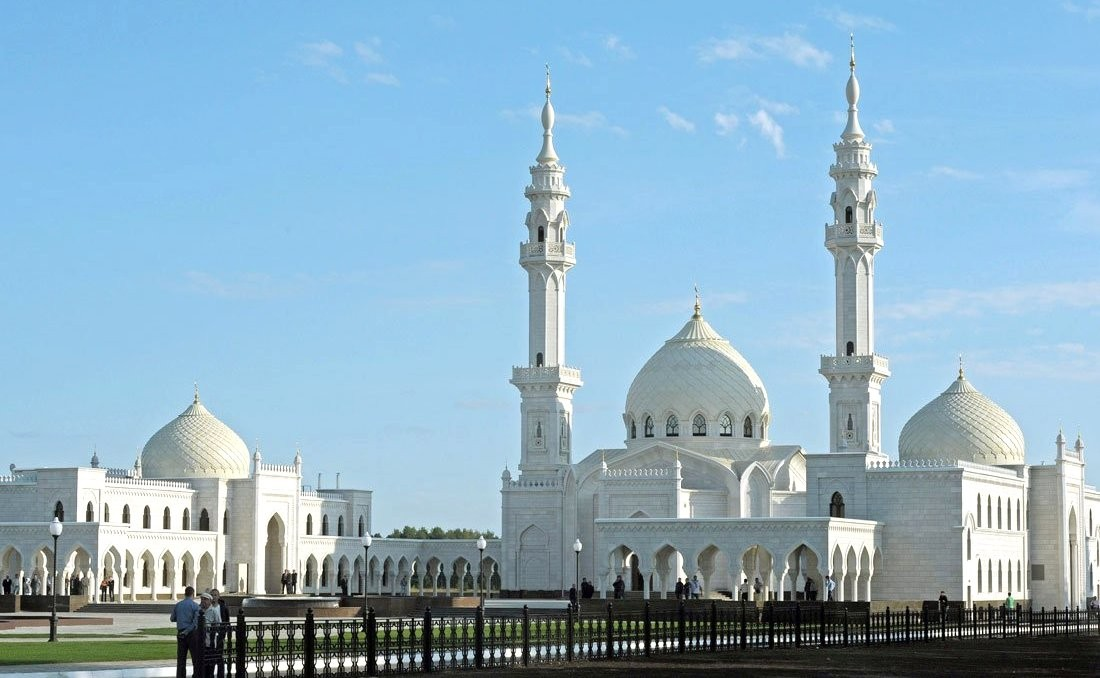
Bulgar Mosque

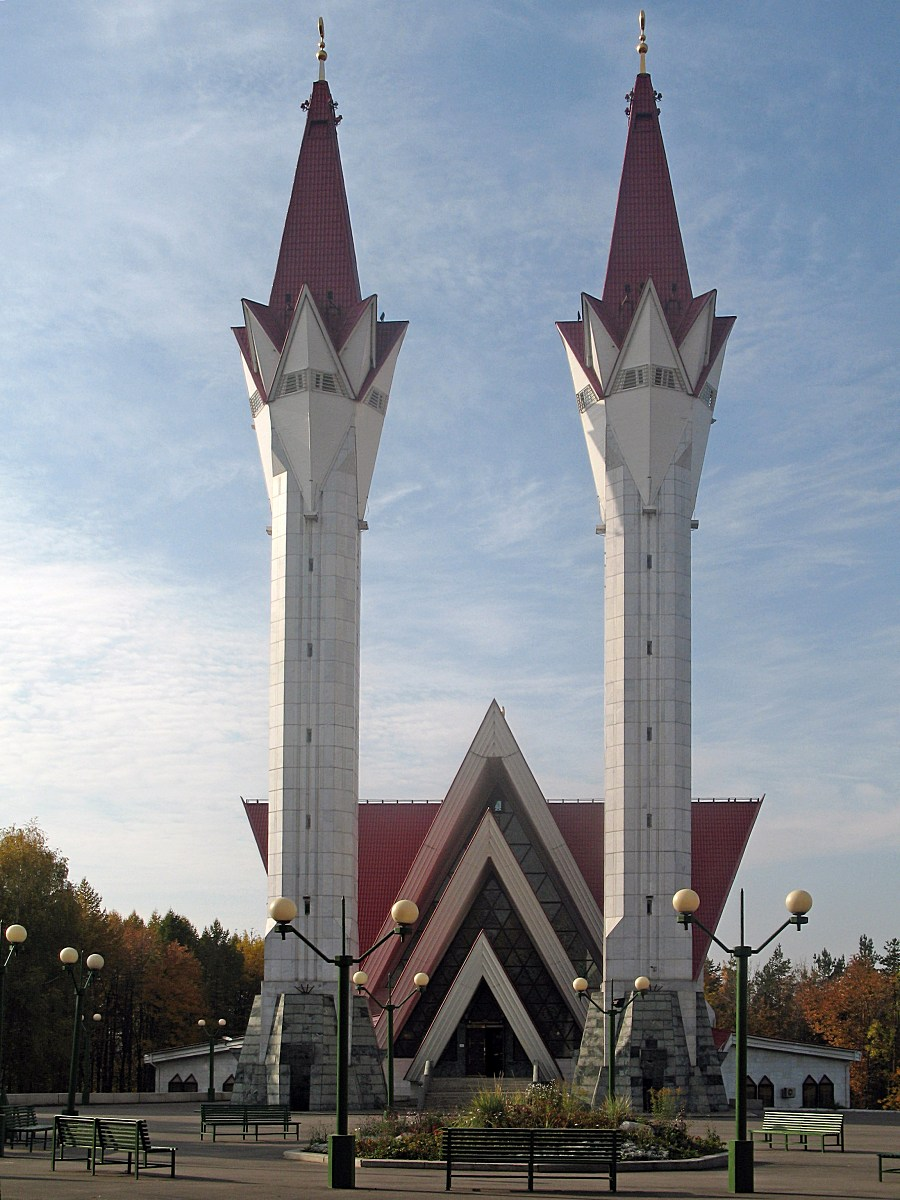
Lala Tulpan in Ufa

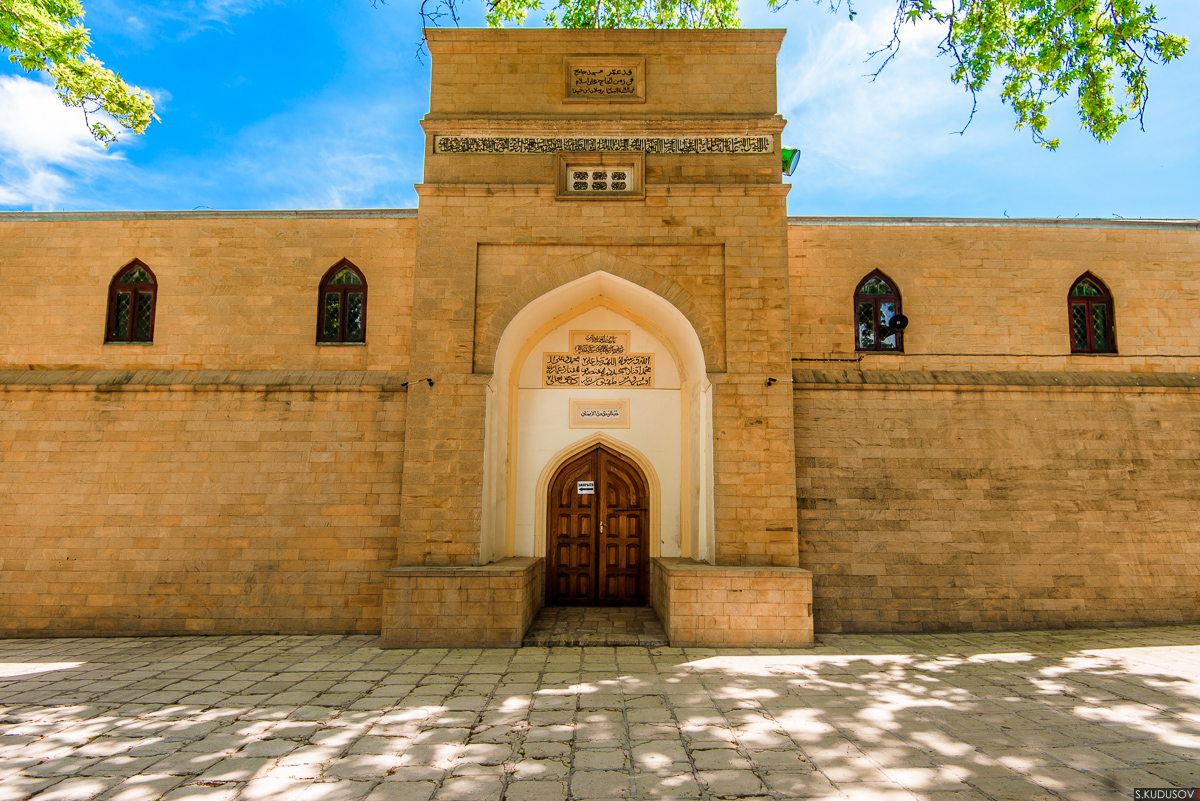
The Juma Mosque in Derbent built 736

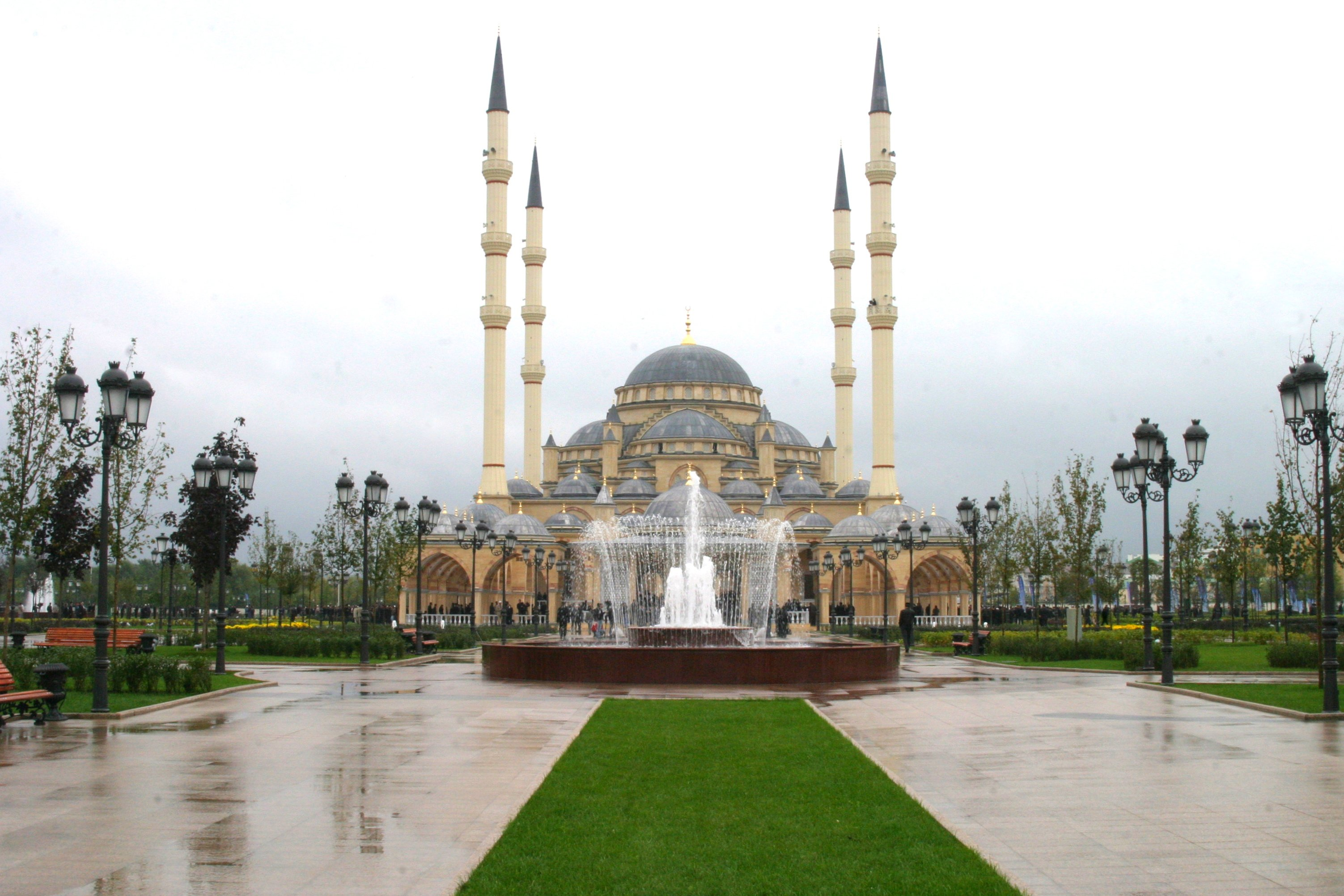
The Heart of Chechnya mosque

Russia has a Buddhist minority, notably in Kalmykia.

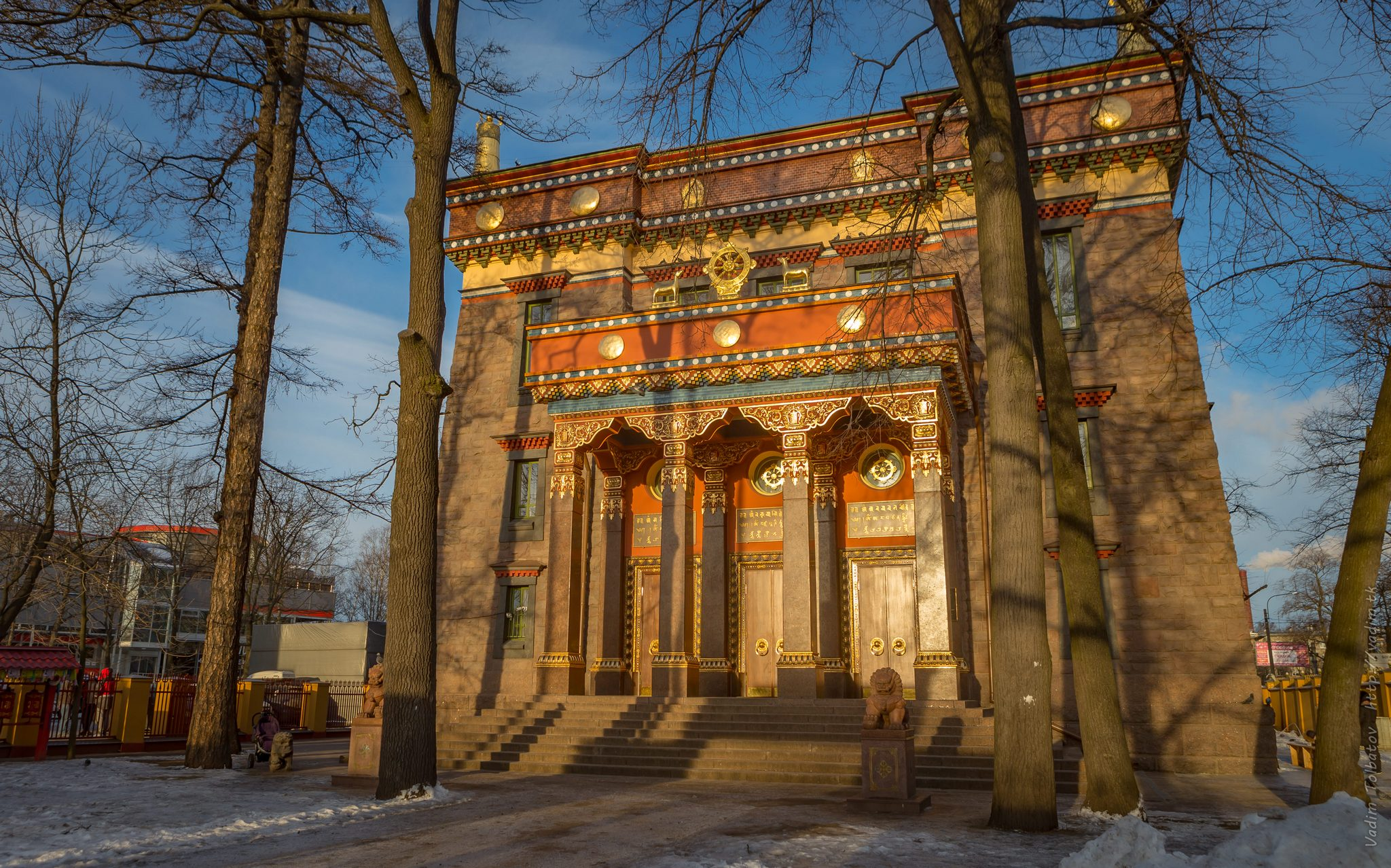
The Datsan Gunzechoinei in St.Petersburg

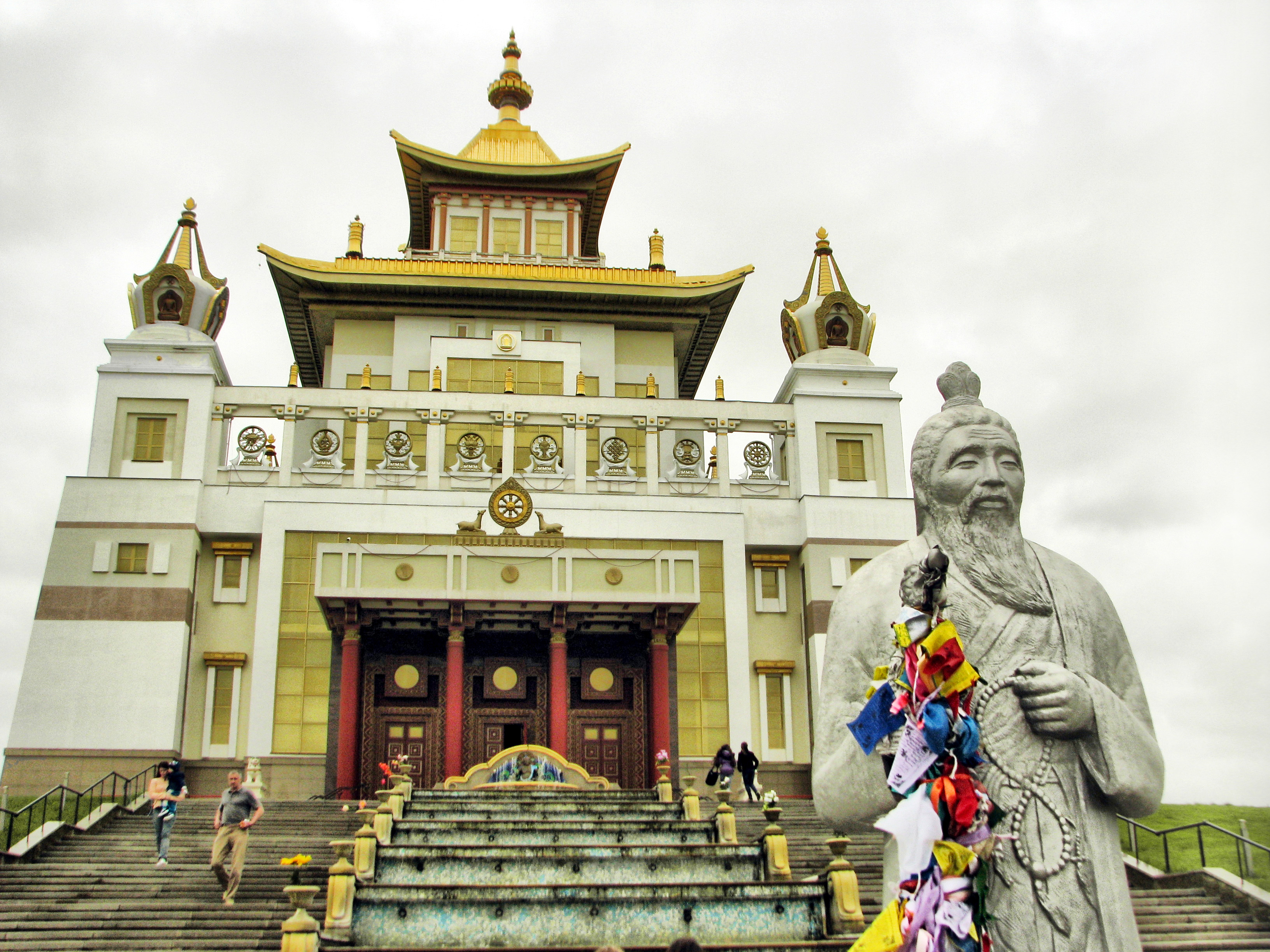
The Burkhan Bakshin Altan Sume in Elista

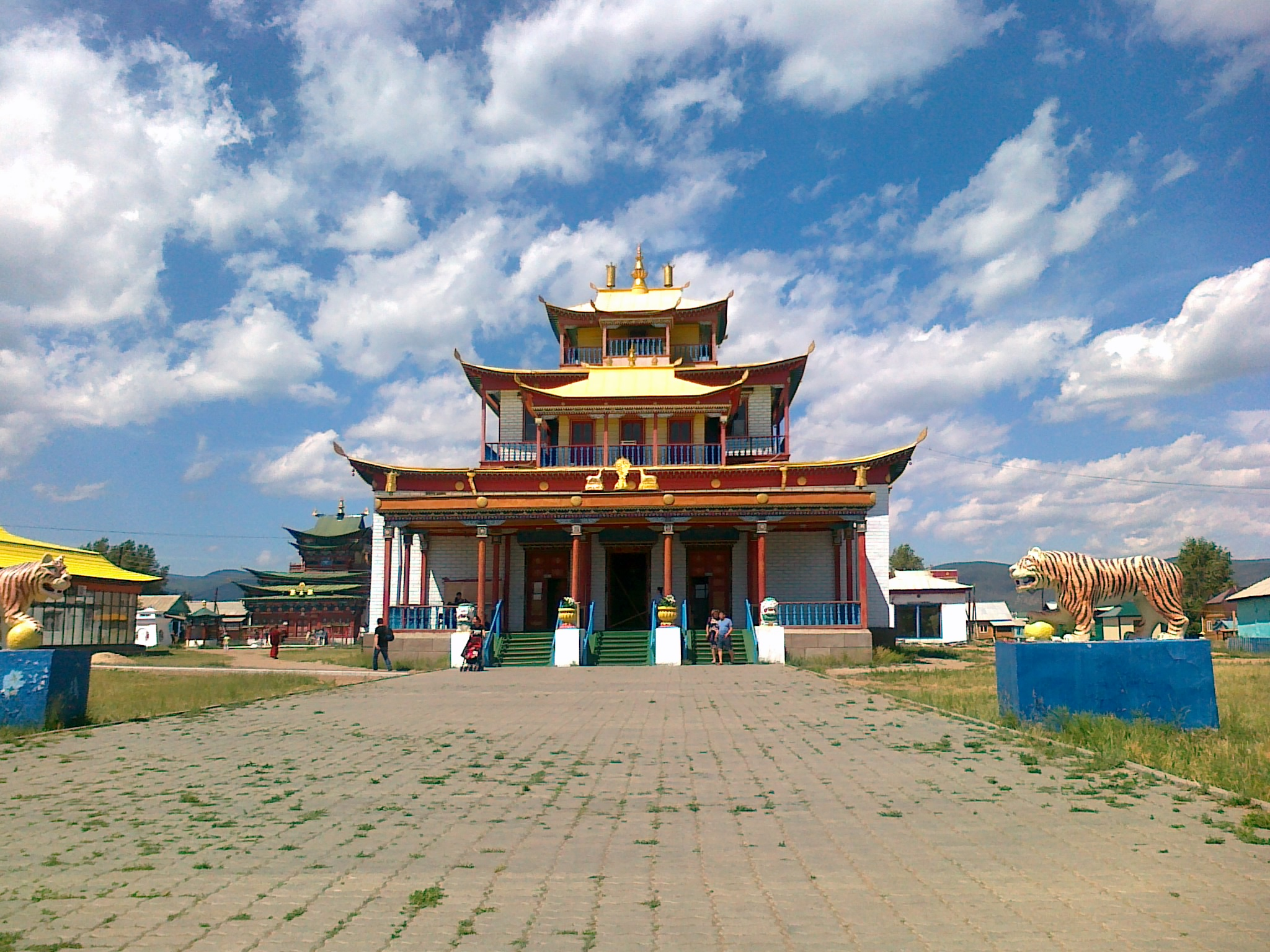
Ivolginsky Datsan in Buryatia

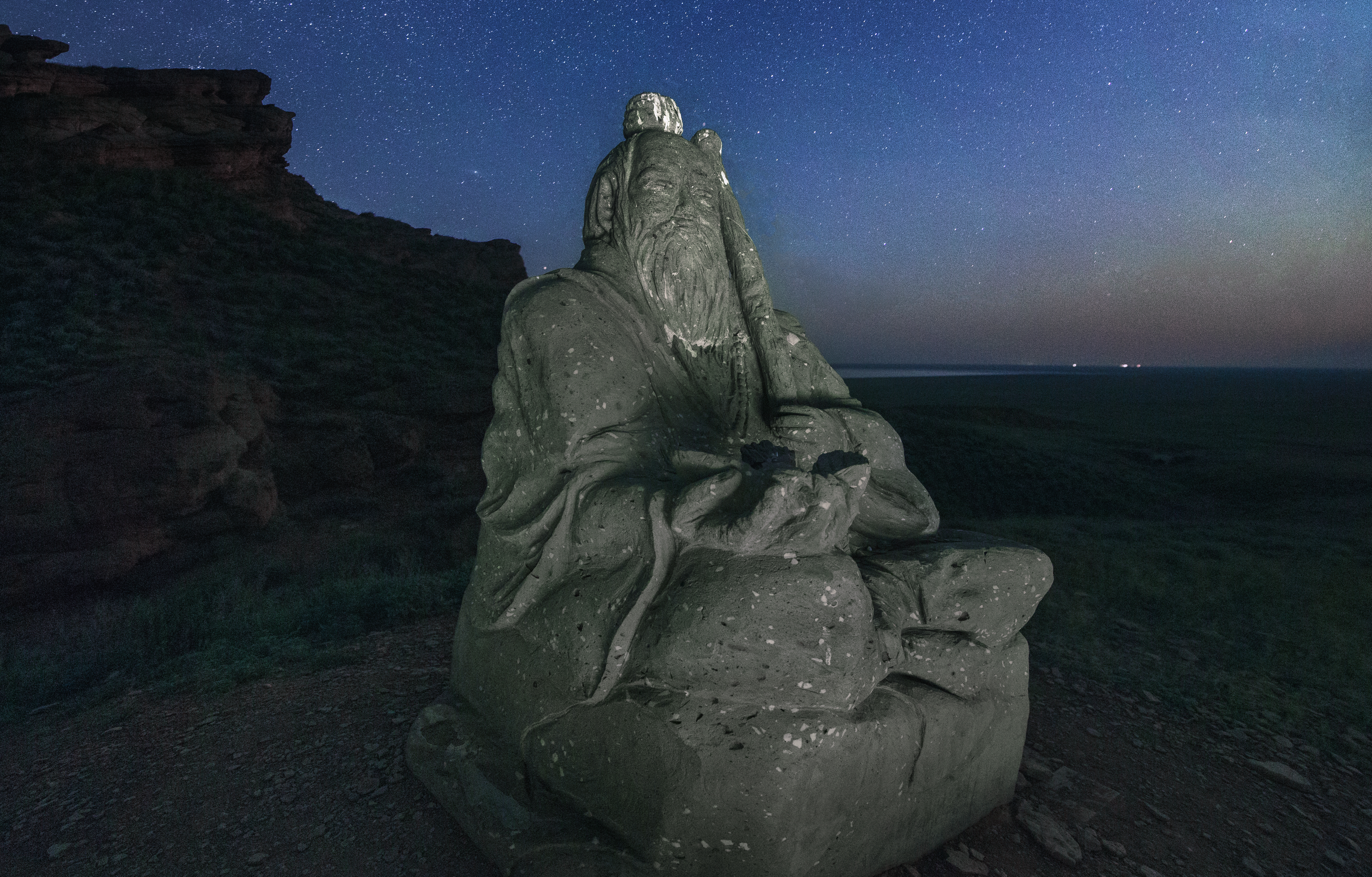
Sagaan Ubgen statue on Big Bogdo mountain sacred site in Astrakhan Oblast

== Historical visitor statistics ==
Total visitors for all purposes by year
2019	▲32,866,265
2018	▲32,550,677
2017	▲32,035,443
2016	▼31,466,538
2015	▲33,729,187
2014	▲32,421,490
2013	▲30,792,091
2012	▲28,176,502
2011	▲24,932,061
2010	▲22,281,217
2009	▼21,338,650
2008	▲23,676,140
2007	22,908,625

Number of visitors for all purposes by nationality by year (2024–2021)
Nationality	Total			
Nationality	2024	2023	2022	2021
Kazakhstan	3,407,706	3,163,214		
Uzbekistan	3,360,423	3,109,445		
Tajikistan	1,701,543	2,153,956		
China	1,695,873	794,387		
Kyrgyzstan	1,195,392	1,140,239		
Abkhazia	718,101	764,766		
Armenia	621,015	616,659		
Azerbaijan	533,020	476,743		
Belarus	519,591	414,677		
Mongolia	367,451	311,479		

Number of visitors for all purposes by nationality by year (2020–2016)
Nationality	Total				
Nationality	2020	2019	2018	2017	2016
Ukraine	▼3,648,972	▼8,646,295	▼9,177,272	▲9,817,008	▼9,737,405
Kazakhstan	▼1,426,727	▲4,324,856	▲4,241,244	▼4,137,613	▼4,686,059
Uzbekistan	▼720,041	▲2,588,922	▲2,354,642	▲2,350,007	▼2,116,480
Abkhazia	▼414,927	▲600,399	▲492,310	▲436,368	▼415,606
Tajikistan	▼401,888	▲1,557,148	▼1,340,975	▲1,350,356	▲1,293,270
Kyrgyzstan	▼299,611	▲959,130	▲859,735	▲836,946	▼792,042
Azerbaijan	▼269,807	▲1,175,045	▲1,145,327	▼1,143,243	▲1,156,703
Armenia	▼209,812	▼816,454	▼825,200	▲857,212	▼833,577
Finland	▼180,110	▼938,693	▼994,098	▼1,063,348	▼1,376,646
Belarus	▼176,601	▲440,438	▲403,597	▲382,022	▼320,372
China	▼155,594	▲2,257,039	▲2,030,319	▲1,780,200	▲1,565,524
Moldova	▼154,766	▼614,043	▼698,027	▲803,916	▼699,112
Philippines	▼133,414	▲193,031	▲179,672	▲172,278	▼160,734
Poland	▼133,014	▼680,382	▼728,546	▼765,544	▼1,056,013
Turkey	▼132,372	▼187,612	▲196,061	▲181,285	▼120,035
Estonia	▼105,584	▲540,062	▲496,582	▼432,803	▲433,926
Latvia	▼93,865	▲365,783	▲355,641	▼330,266	▲360,603
Stateless persons	▼74,215	▼303,851	▲327,613	▼318,393	▼321,383
South Ossetia	▼70,470	▲147,355	▲143,501	▲137,427	▼115,382
Germany	▼69,456	▲744,473	▲701,576	▲629,082	▲613,370
Lithuania	▼57,883	▲253,950	▼243,190	▼256,009	▲281,168
Mongolia	▼56,625	▼394,994	▼401,485	▼416,293	▲542,196
Georgia	▼56,266	▼120,086	▲123,732	▲117,204	▼65,378
India	▼46,025	▲180,567	▲159,865	▲130,400	▲108,498
South Korea	▼42,297	▲453,796	▲386,413	▲276,560	▲181,024
France	▼38,391	▲249,410	▲236,583	▲211,673	▲201,260
Israel	▼32,402	▲260,472	▲228,530	▲185,426	▲182,438
Italy	▼28,432	▲251,751	▲225,776	▼206,860	▲208,689
Serbia	▼26,731	▼84,852	▲96,730	▲87,899	▲79,575
United Kingdom	▼22,471	▼194,956	▲216,029	▲193,522	▼190,278
Turkmenistan	▼21,680	▲92,616	▲82,675	▲65,749	▲56,258
Vietnam	▼19,477	▲90,565	▲84,612	▲77,391	▲66,939
United States	▼19,306	▼300,933	▲337,395	▲293,011	▲248,990
Japan	▼16,048	▲127,696	▲119,240	▲114,207	▲95,675
Netherlands	▼14,663	▲84,651	▲80,540	▲73,729	▲68,017
Egypt	▼13,481	▼28,039	▲39,402		
Iran	▼12,725	▼54,469	▼61,007	▲91,862	▲75,203
Thailand	▼12,183	▲72,031	▲64,898	▲52,697	▲32,222
Greece	▼11,732	▲44,784	▲42,967	▼41,205	▲46,730
Bulgaria	▼10,255	▲41,083	▲40,836	▼39,191	▲41,290
Austria	▼9,977	▲67,429	▲64,500	▲59,501	▼56,663
Czech Republic	▼9,874	▲57,835	▲53,739	▲49,232	▲47,288
Indonesia	▼9,671	▲40,284	▲31,695	▲25,425	▲20,211
Spain	▼9,565	▲140,181	▲123,652	▲118,642	▲116,032
Romania	▼9,335	▲32,779	▲29,920	▲26,330	▼23,684
Norway	▼8,506	▲52,022	▼51,003	▲53,197	▼46,631
Sweden	▼8,308	▼43,198	▲55,329	▼32,095	▼39,153
Belgium	▼7,534	▼42,473	▲48,270	▲38,868	▲37,492
Croatia	▼7,480	▼19,243	▲36,045		
Switzerland	▼7,407	▼55,747	▲59,828	▲53,167	▲52,656
Cuba	▼6,631	▲29,169	▼27,882	▲30,711	▲26,667
Hungary	▼5,680	▲35,541	▲32,998	▲25,659	▲25,313
Denmark	▼5,016	24,662	▲31,308		
Total	▼ n/a	▲32,866,265	▲32,550,677	▲32,035,443	▼31,466,538

Number of visitors for all purposes by nationality by year (2015–2010)
Nationality	Total					
Nationality	2015	2014	2013	2012	2011	2010
Ukraine	▲10,314,757	▲9,842,990	▲7,080,991	▲6,502,543	▲6,072,775	4,198,030
Kazakhstan	▲5,180,246	▲4,215,161	▲3,848,899	▲3,630,342	▲3,049,406	2,747,358
Uzbekistan	▼2,163,256	▼2,353,140	▲2,967444	▲2,677,322	▲2,086,359	1,584,086
Poland	▼1,766,612	▲1,823,143	▲1,644,657	▲1,190,003	▲704,610	394,872
Finland	▲1,476,412	▲1,446,169	▲1,388,036	▲1,375,614	▲1,211,520	1,012,621
China	▲1,353,051	▲1,125,098	▲1,071,515	▲978,988	▲845,588	747,640
Tajikistan	▼1,200,972	▼1,202,260	▲1,348,868	▲1,134,150	▲955,455	830,160
Azerbaijan	▲1,071,324	▼1,021,204	▲1,196,759	▲1,116,238	▲1,045,525	979,778
Armenia	▲850,137	▼794,098	▲882,864	▲700,332	▲550,349	459,040
Kyrgyzstan	▲842,396	▼725,664	▲763,418	▲623,970	▲592,960	552,909
Moldova	▼770,965	▼923,625	▲1,374,690	▲1,194,291	▲1,073,637	988,084
Germany	▼595,200	▼635,153	▲686,557	▲671,676	▲629,391	611,367
Mongolia	▲505,429	▼225,972	▼226,673	▲365,236	▲212,117	157,367
Belarus	▼424,531	▲495,999	▲418,207	▲372,942	▲267,233	259,191
Abkhazia	▲422,130	▲362,811	▲293,429	▲273,964	▲202,440	52,289
Estonia	▲382,031	▼363,942	▼430,164	▼494,282	▲519,402	474,949
Latvia	▼348,338	▼374,701	▼391,304	▼461,162	▲571,374	569,300
Stateless persons	▼326,841	▼349,400	▼463,640	▼523,333	▼618,705	679,757
Turkey	▼323,039	▼361,416	▲385,147	▲305,429	▲249,109	196,704
Lithuania	▼270,600	▼487,206	▼539,308	▼553,896	▼622,740	760,728
United States	▼242,104	▼257,070	▲305,954	286,551	▲275,239	262,060
Italy	▼204,710	▼219,976	▲225,933	▲212,411	207,476	198,002
France	▼191,643	▼219,210	▲225,860	▲225,343	▲213,473	194,248
United Kingdom	▼190,775	▼228,346	▲259,676	▲231,670	▲221,418	212,847
Israel	▲165,003	▲152,853	▲136,827	▲123,974	▲114,380	100,291
Philippines	▲163,010	▲162,990	▲149,213	▲130,541	▲99,405	81,385
South Korea	▲153,189	▲135,676	▲107,942	▲94,922	▲91,335	90,622
South Ossetia	▲125,444	▲117,283	▲94,159	▲73,863	▲47,739	33,409
Spain	▲110,247	▼100,206	▲109,089	▼101,536	▲129,730	110,601
India	▲95,527	▼94,259	▲95,542	▲80,127	▲60,191	53,364
Japan	▼93,550	▲105,220	▲102,408	▲86,806	▼76,204	78,188
Serbia	▼79,406	▼87,048	▲107,601	▲70,371	▲57,177	47,939
Georgia	▲69,095	▲58,264	▲48,440	▲35,511	▲30,415	24,568
Netherlands	▼63,469	▼80,543	▲86,402	▼81,212	▲87,549	80,720
Vietnam	▼60,882	▼75,840	▲81,073	▲62,961	▲53,529	50,823
Austria	▼57,242	67,392	▲74,277	▲71,863	▲70,388	67,606
Turkmenistan	▲51,170	▲47,002	▼40,238	▲43,720	▲39,579	35,017
Norway	▼49,535	▲57,423	▲54,433	▲50,115	▲48,614	45,340
Iran.	▲46,760	▲29,743	▼20,657	▲23,085	▲21,575	20,576
Czech Republic	▼46,432	▼68,875	▲76,530	▲62,980	▲46,776	40,565
Switzerland	▼46,200	▼50,838	▲54,898	▲52,852	▲47,978	44,964
Canada	▼43,663	▼53,370	▲61,234	▲54,730	▲52,238	48,559
Greece	▼41,210	▼46,450	▲48,280	▲36,474	▲33,569	33,396
Sweden	▼40,424	▼49,908	▲53,340	▼58,900	▲60,840	54,253
Australia	▼39,613	▼46,072	▲46,861	▲43,105	▲34,868	30,583
Bulgaria	▼37,035	▼42,230	▲47,154	▲45,312	▲42,031	38,446
Brazil	▲35,531	▼33,301	▲37,386	▲33,647	▲29,840	21,950
Belgium	▼33,714	▼37,441	▲40,316	▲37,025	▲36,430	33,571
Thailand	▲29,482	▲25,585	▲23,919	▲19,375	▲17,023	15,192
Romania	▼25,970	▼28,391	▲30,886	▲24,792	▲21,993	17,884
Hungary	▼24,849	▲28,421	▲27,155	▼23,047	▲23,241	20,736
Mexico	▲22,922	▼18,223	▲21,527	▼16,431	▲16,759	13,767
North Korea	▼20,893	▲23,902	▲23,604	▲22,071	▼18,901	21,167
Slovakia	▼19,876	▼24,962	▲27,554	▲24,161	▲20,445	18,512
Indonesia	▼18,100	▼20,330	▲21,088	▲18,572	▲18,313	14,448
Argentina	▲17,322	▼13,614	▲15,944	▲13,976	▲12,316	9,044
Portugal	▲15,475	▲15,181	▼14,952	▼15,398	▼15,814	18,434
Cuba	▲12,349	▲11,609	▲9,625	▲5,293	▲4,099	4,053
Total	▲33,729,187	▲32,421,490	▲30,792,091	▲28,176,502	▲24,932,016	▲22,281,217

== Historical visa statistics ==
The following is a list of the 10 countries to whose citizens were issued the most Russian electronic visas: Issuance of e-visas was suspended from 2020 to 2023.

Country	2024	2023
China	311,839	86,619
Saudi Arabia	63,218	8,915
Germany	52,425	11,335
Turkey	42,202	9,865
India	32,145	9,456
Estonia	25,404	13,318
Latvia	19,410	5,137
Kuwait	16,982	3,924
Iran	16,973	3,276
Lithuania	10,121	3,107
Total	670,947	170,104

The following is a list of the 10 countries to whose citizens were issued the most Russian visas:

Country	Number of visas issued in					
Country	2020	2019	2018	2017	2016	2015
Germany	58,953	410,780	360,582	336,423	324,959	299,791
China	41,280	453,338	406,831	371,489	339,030	357,040
Turkey	34,162	83,169	81,177	79,898	45,209	33,698
France	27,059	172,870	146,491	145,576	131,229	119,314
United Kingdom	20,770	92,573	88,290	96,246	93,169	87,863
Italy	18,272	162,529	139,797	129,124	129,038	117,123
United States	16,736	106,250	98,936	95,630	94,682	85,974
Finland	14,271	110,480	105,157	108,792	116,462	112,655
Latvia	11,295	78,727	79,082	74,382	77,574	70,328
Poland	10,535	67,666	62,840	59,187	54,885	43,038
Total	452 161	3,090,538	2,758,893	2,687,146	2,505,457	2,283,850

== See also ==
- Visa policy of Russia
- Russian culture
- List of museums in Russia
- List of World Heritage Sites in Russia
- Wildlife of Russia
