= Burangulovo, Uchalinsky District, Republic of Bashkortostan =

Burangulovo Бурангулово
- Village
- Location within Bashkortostan Location within Russia
- Coordinates: 54°33′N 59°24′E
- Country: Russia
- Region: Bashkortostan
- District: Uchalinsky District
- Time zone: UTC+5:00

Burangulovo (Russian: Бурангулово; Bashkir: Буранғол, Buranğol) is a rural locality (a village) in Mansurovsky Selsoviet, Uchalinsky District, Bashkortostan, Russia. The population was 67 as of 2010. There are 3 streets.

== Geography ==
Burangulovo is located 41 km north of Uchaly (the district's administrative centre) by road. Rysayevo is the nearest rural locality.
