= Yuldashevo, Uchalinsky District, Republic of Bashkortostan =

Yuldashevo Юлдашево
- Selo
- Location within Bashkortostan Location within Russia
- Coordinates: 54°22′N 59°15′E
- Country: Russia
- Region: Bashkortostan
- District: Uchalinsky District
- Time zone: UTC+5:00

Yuldashevo (Russian: Юлдашево; Bashkir: Юлдаш, Yuldaş) is a rural locality (a selo) in Kunakbayevsky Selsoviet, Uchalinsky District, Bashkortostan, Russia. The population was 683 as of 2010. There are 18 streets.

== Geography ==
Yuldashevo is located 11 km northwest of Uchaly (the district's administrative centre) by road. Iltebanovo is the nearest rural locality.
