= Ustinovo, Republic of Bashkortostan =

Ustinovo Устиново
- Village
- Location within Bashkortostan Location within Russia
- Coordinates: 54°51′N 59°58′E
- Country: Russia
- Region: Bashkortostan
- District: Uchalinsky District
- Time zone: UTC+5:00

Ustinovo (Russian: Устиново; Bashkir: Үстинәү, Üstinäw) is a rural locality (a village) in Ilchigulovsky Selsoviet, Uchalinsky District, Bashkortostan, Russia. The population was 26 as of 2010. There is 1 street.

== Geography ==
Ustinovo is located 8 km northwest of Uchaly (the district's administrative centre) by road.
