= Tanychau =

Tanychau Танычау
- Village
- Location within Bashkortostan Location within Russia
- Coordinates: 54°12′N 59°29′E
- Country: Russia
- Region: Bashkortostan
- District: Uchalinsky District
- Time zone: UTC+5:00

Tanychau (Russian: Танычау; Bashkir: Танысау, Tanısaw) is a rural locality (a village) in Akhunovsky Selsoviet, Uchalinsky District, Bashkortostan, Russia. The population was 71 as of 2010. There are 3 streets.

== Geography ==
Tanychau is located 33 km southeast of Uchaly (the district's administrative centre) by road. Buyda is the nearest rural locality.
