= Suyundyukovo, Uchalinsky District, Republic of Bashkortostan =

Suyundyukovo Суюндюково
- Village
- Location within Bashkortostan Location within Russia
- Coordinates: 54°48′N 59°51′E
- Country: Russia
- Region: Bashkortostan
- District: Uchalinsky District
- Time zone: UTC+5:00

Suyundyukovo (Russian: Суюндюково; Bashkir: Һөйөндөк, Höyöndök) is a rural locality (a village) in Ilchigulovsky Selsoviet, Uchalinsky District, Bashkortostan, Russia. The population was 117 as of 2010. There are 2 streets.

== Geography ==
Suyundyukovo is located 77 km northeast of Uchaly (the district's administrative centre) by road. Kuchukovo is the nearest rural locality.
