= Mansurovo, Uchalinsky District, Republic of Bashkortostan =

Mansurovo Мансурово
- Village
- Location within Bashkortostan Location within Russia
- Coordinates: 54°29′N 59°31′E
- Country: Russia
- Region: Bashkortostan
- District: Uchalinsky District
- Time zone: UTC+5:00

Mansurovo (Russian: Мансурово; Bashkir: Мансур, Mansur) is a rural locality (a village) and the administrative centre of Mansurovsky Selsoviet, Uchalinsky District, Bashkortostan, Russia. The population was 740 as of 2010. There are 21 streets.

== Geography ==
Mansurovo is located 26 km northeast of Uchaly (the district's administrative centre) by road. Ilyinka is the nearest rural locality.
