= Kalkanovo =

Kalkanovo Калканово
- Village
- Location within Bashkortostan Location within Russia
- Coordinates: 54°24′N 59°18′E
- Country: Russia
- Region: Bashkortostan
- District: Uchalinsky District
- Time zone: UTC+5:00

Kalkanovo (Russian: Калканово; Bashkir: Ҡалҡан, Qalqan) is a rural locality (a village) in Uchalinsky Selsoviet, Uchalinsky District, Bashkortostan, Russia. The population was 332 as of 2010. There are 5 streets.

== Geography ==
Kalkanovo is located 18 km northwest of Uchaly (the district's administrative centre) by road. Yuldashevo and Urgunovo are the nearest rural localities.
