= Kuchukovo-Mayak =

Kuchukovo-Mayak Кучуково-Маяк
- Village
- Location within Bashkortostan Location within Russia
- Coordinates: 54°00′N 58°57′E
- Country: Russia
- Region: Bashkortostan
- District: Uchalinsky District
- Time zone: UTC+5:00

Kuchukovo-Mayak (Russian: Кучуково-Маяк; Bashkir: Көсөк-Маяҡ, Kösök-Mayaq) is a rural locality (a village) in Amangildinsky Selsoviet, Uchalinsky District, Bashkortostan, Russia. The population was 135 as of 2010. There are 3 streets.

== Geography ==
Kuchukovo-Mayak is located 66 km southwest of Uchaly (the district's administrative centre) by road. Suramanovo is the nearest rural locality.
