= Polyakovka, Uchalinsky District, Republic of Bashkortostan =

Polyakovka Поляковка
- Selo
- Location within Bashkortostan Location within Russia
- Coordinates: 54°37′N 59°42′E
- Country: Russia
- Region: Bashkortostan
- District: Uchalinsky District
- Time zone: UTC+5:00

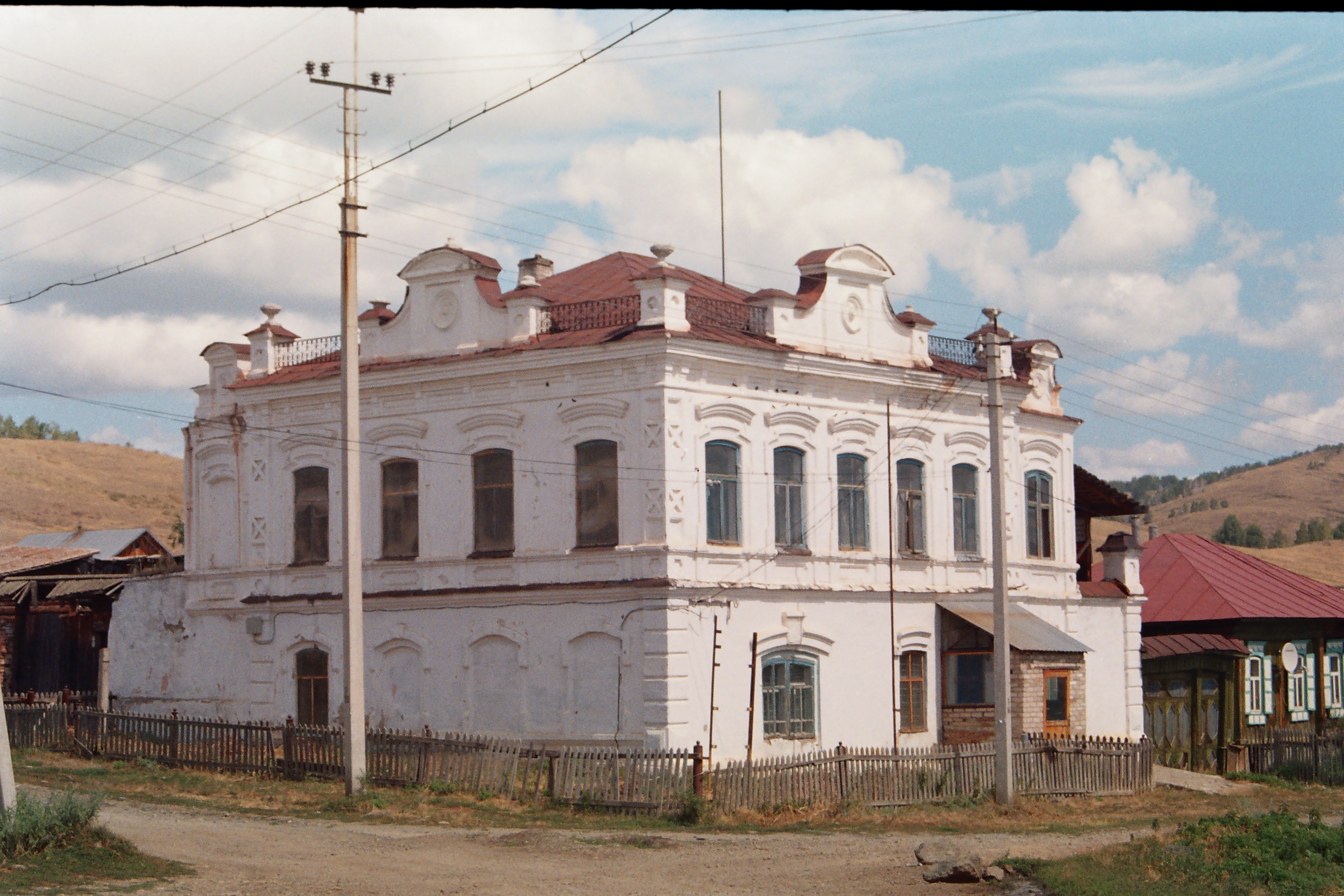
A 2-storey brick house in the village of Polyakovka, Bashkortostan, Russia

Polyakovka (Russian: Поляковка) is a rural locality (a selo) and the administrative centre of Polyakovsky Selsoviet, Uchalinsky District, Bashkortostan, Russia. The population was 677 as of 2010. There are 11 streets.

== Geography ==
Polyakovka is located 46 km northeast of Uchaly (the district's administrative centre) by road. Komsomolsk is the nearest rural locality.
