= Malokazakkulovo =

Malokazakkulovo Малоказаккулово
- Village
- Location within Bashkortostan Location within Russia
- Coordinates: 54°03′N 58°56′E
- Country: Russia
- Region: Bashkortostan
- District: Uchalinsky District
- Time zone: UTC+5:00

Malokazakkulovo (Russian: Малоказаккулово; Bashkir: Бәләкәй Ҡаҙаҡҡол, Bäläkäy Qaźaqqol) is a rural locality (a village) and the administrative centre of Amangildinsky Selsoviet, Uchalinsky District, Bashkortostan, Russia. The population was 309 as of 2010. There are 5 streets.

== Geography ==
Malokazakkulovo is located 55 km southwest of Uchaly (the district's administrative centre) by road. Amangildino is the nearest rural locality.
