= Yalchigulovo =

Yalchigulovo Яльчигулово
- Village
- Location within Bashkortostan Location within Russia
- Coordinates: 54°43′N 59°40′E
- Country: Russia
- Region: Bashkortostan
- District: Uchalinsky District
- Time zone: UTC+5:00

Yalchigulovo (Russian: Яльчигулово; Bashkir: Ялсығол, Yalsığol) is a rural locality (a village) in Tungatarovsky Selsoviet, Uchalinsky District, Bashkortostan, Russia. The population was 75 as of 2010. There are 2 streets.

== Geography ==
Yalchigulovo is located 58 km northeast of Uchaly (the district's administrative centre) by road. Starobayramgulovo is the nearest rural locality.
