= Kutuyevo =

Kutuyevo Кутуево
- Village
- Location within Bashkortostan Location within Russia
- Coordinates: 54°10′N 59°02′E
- Country: Russia
- Region: Bashkortostan
- District: Uchalinsky District
- Time zone: UTC+5:00

Kutuyevo (Russian: Кутуево; Bashkir: Ҡотой, Qotoy) is a rural locality (a village) in Urazovsky Selsoviet, Uchalinsky District, Bashkortostan, Russia. The population was 230 as of 2010. There are 3 streets.

== Geography ==
Kutuyevo is located 37 km southwest of Uchaly (the district's administrative centre) by road. Ishmekeyevo is the nearest rural locality.
