= Kudashevo, Uchalinsky District, Republic of Bashkortostan =

Kudashevo Кудашево
- Village
- Location within Bashkortostan Location within Russia
- Coordinates: 54°12′N 59°15′E
- Country: Russia
- Region: Bashkortostan
- District: Uchalinsky District
- Time zone: UTC+5:00

Kudashevo (Russian: Кудашево; Bashkir: Ҡоҙаш, Qoźaş) is a rural locality (a village) in Imangulovsky Selsoviet, Uchalinsky District, Bashkortostan, Russia. The population was 377 as of 2010. There are 10 streets.

== Geography ==
Kudashevo is located 17 km southwest of Uchaly (the district's administrative centre) by road. Rasulevo is the nearest rural locality.
