= Nauruzovo =

Nauruzovo Наурузово
- Selo
- Location within Bashkortostan Location within Russia
- Coordinates: 54°02′N 59°04′E
- Country: Russia
- Region: Bashkortostan
- District: Uchalinsky District
- Time zone: UTC+5:00

Nauruzovo (Russian: Наурузово; Bashkir: Наурыҙ, Nawrıź) is a rural locality (a selo) and the administrative centre of Nauruzovsky Selsoviet, Uchalinsky District, Bashkortostan, Russia. The population was 410 as of 2010. There are 12 streets.

== Geography ==
Nauruzovo is located 51 km southwest of Uchaly (the district's administrative centre) by road. Mishkino is the nearest rural locality.
