= Tashmuryn =

Tashmuryn Ташмурын
- Village
- Location within Bashkortostan Location within Russia
- Coordinates: 54°14′N 59°39′E
- Country: Russia
- Region: Bashkortostan
- District: Uchalinsky District
- Time zone: UTC+5:00

Tashmuryn (Russian: Ташмурын; Bashkir: Ташморон, Taşmoron) is a rural locality (a village) in Akhunovsky Selsoviet, Uchalinsky District, Bashkortostan, Russia. The population was 1 as of 2010.

== Geography ==
Tashmuryn is located 32 km southeast of Uchaly (the district's administrative centre) by road. Kidysh is the nearest rural locality.
