= Istamgulovo =

Istamgulovo Истамгулово
- Village
- Location within Bashkortostan Location within Russia
- Coordinates: 54°08′N 59°09′E
- Country: Russia
- Region: Bashkortostan
- District: Uchalinsky District
- Time zone: UTC+5:00

Istamgulovo (Russian: Истамгулово; Bashkir: Ыҫтамғол, Iśtamğol) is a rural locality (a village) in Uralsky Selsoviet, Uchalinsky District, Bashkortostan, Russia. The population was 278 as of 2010. There are 8 streets.

== Geography ==
Istamgulovo is located 39 km southwest of Uchaly (the district's administrative centre) by road. Uralsk is the nearest rural locality.
