= Bazargulovo =

Bazargulovo Базаргулово
- Village
- Location within Bashkortostan Location within Russia
- Coordinates: 54°11′N 59°10′E
- Country: Russia
- Region: Bashkortostan
- District: Uchalinsky District
- Time zone: UTC+5:00

Bazargulovo (Russian: Базаргулово; Bashkir: Баҙарғол, Baźarğol) is a rural locality (a village) in Uralsky Selsoviet, Uchalinsky District, Bashkortostan, Russia. The population was 47 as of 2010. There are 2 streets.

== Geography ==
Bazargulovo is located 32 km southwest of Uchaly (the district's administrative centre) by road. Rasulevo is the nearest rural locality.
