= Tungatarovo =

Tungatarovo Тунгатарово
- Selo
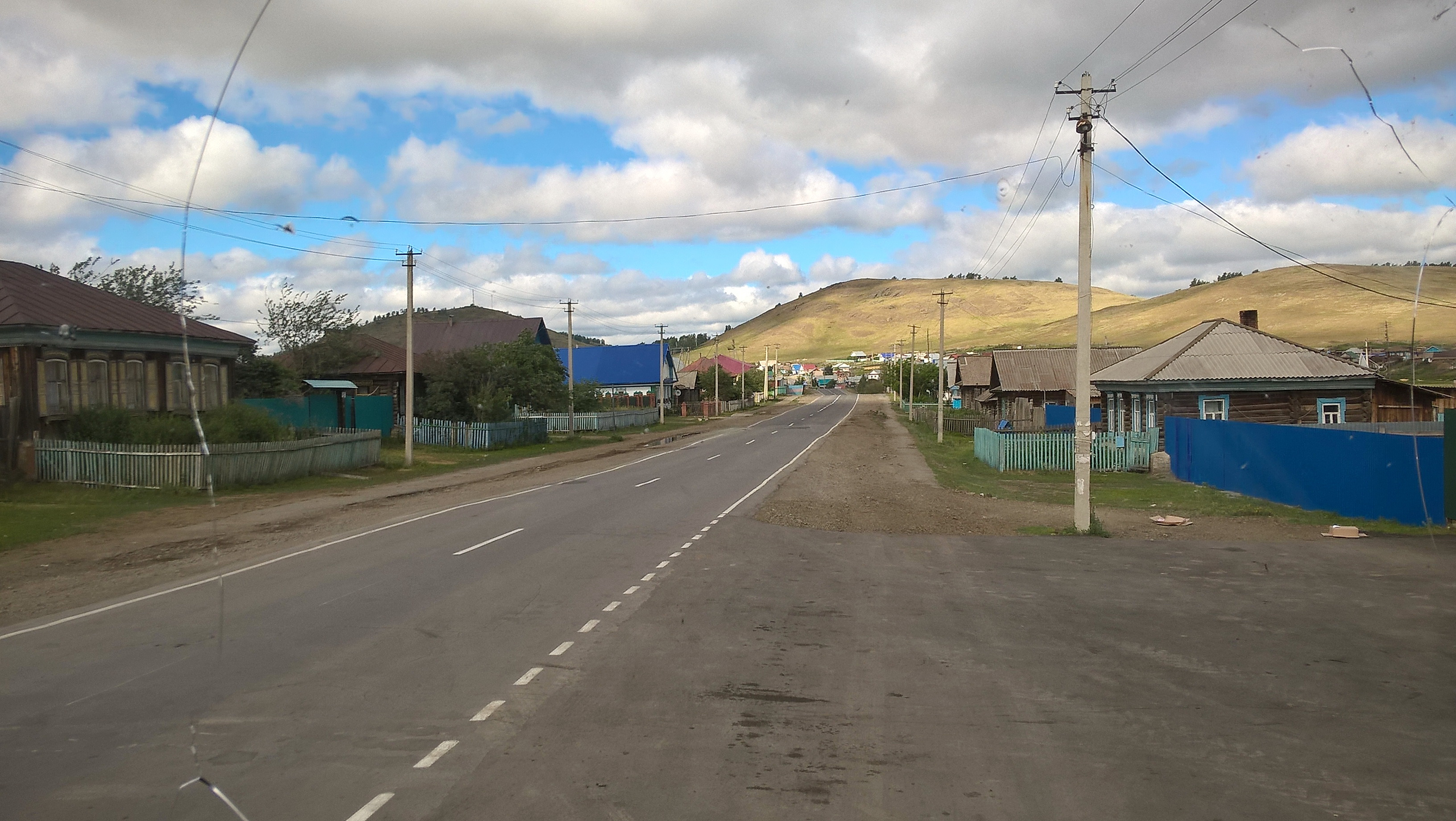

- Location within Bashkortostan Location within Russia
- Coordinates: 54°36′N 59°43′E
- Country: Russia
- Region: Bashkortostan
- District: Uchalinsky District
- Time zone: UTC+5:00

Tungatarovo (Russian: Тунгатарово; Bashkir: Туңғатар, Tuñğatar) is a rural locality (a selo) in Tungatarovsky Selsoviet, Uchalinsky District, Bashkortostan, Russia. The population was 504 as of 2010. There are 5 streets.

== Geography ==
Tungatarovo is located 43 km northeast of Uchaly (the district's administrative centre) by road. Komsomolsk is the nearest rural locality.
