= Gadelshino =

Gadelshino Гадельшино
- Village
- Location within Bashkortostan Location within Russia
- Coordinates: 54°04′N 59°03′E
- Country: Russia
- Region: Bashkortostan
- District: Uchalinsky District
- Time zone: UTC+5:00

Gadelshino (Russian: Гадельшино; Bashkir: Ғәҙелша, Ğäźelşa) is a rural locality (a village) in Nauruzovsky Selsoviet, Uchalinsky District, Bashkortostan, Russia. The population was 16 as of 2010. There is 1 street.

== Geography ==
Gadelshino is located 48 km southwest of Uchaly (the district's administrative centre) by road. Novobayramgulovo is the nearest rural locality.
