= Staromuynakovo =

Staromuynakovo Старомуйнаково
- Village
- Location within Bashkortostan Location within Russia
- Coordinates: 54°34′N 59°43′E
- Country: Russia
- Region: Bashkortostan
- District: Uchalinsky District
- Time zone: UTC+5:00

Staromuynakovo (Russian: Старомуйнаково; Bashkir: Ҡарт Муйнаҡ, Qart Muynaq) is a rural locality (a village) in Tungatarovsky Selsoviet, Uchalinsky District, Bashkortostan, Russia. The population was 237 as of 2010. There are 4 streets.

== Geography ==
Staromuynakovo is located 39 km northeast of Uchaly (the district's administrative centre) by road. Tungatarovo is the nearest rural locality.
