= Musino, Uchalinsky District, Republic of Bashkortostan =

Musino Мусино
- Village
- Location within Bashkortostan Location within Russia
- Coordinates: 54°06′N 58°55′E
- Country: Russia
- Region: Bashkortostan
- District: Uchalinsky District
- Time zone: UTC+5:00

Musino (Russian: Мусино; Bashkir: Муса, Musa) is a rural locality (a village) in Novobayramgulovsky Selsoviet, Uchalinsky District, Bashkortostan, Russia. The population was 83 as of 2010. There are 2 streets.

== Geography ==
Musino is located 56 km southwest of Uchaly (the district's administrative centre) by road. Kaipkulovo is the nearest rural locality.
