= Shartym =

Shartym Шартым
- Village
- Location within Bashkortostan Location within Russia
- Coordinates: 54°29′N 59°35′E
- Country: Russia
- Region: Bashkortostan
- District: Uchalinsky District
- Time zone: UTC+5:00

Shartym (Russian: Шартым; Bashkir: Шартым, Şartım) is a rural locality (a village) in Safarovsky Selsoviet, Uchalinsky District, Bashkortostan, Russia. The population was 59 as of 2010. There is 1 street.

== Geography ==
Shartym is located 27 km northeast of Uchaly (the district's administrative centre) by road. Ilyinka is the nearest rural locality.
