= Sharipovo, Uchalinsky District, Republic of Bashkortostan =

Sharipovo Шарипово
- Village
- Location within Bashkortostan Location within Russia
- Coordinates: 54°41′N 59°37′E
- Country: Russia
- Region: Bashkortostan
- District: Uchalinsky District
- Time zone: UTC+5:00

Sharipovo (Russian: Шарипово; Bashkir: Шәрип, Şärip) is a rural locality (a village) in Tungatarovsky Selsoviet, Uchalinsky District, Bashkortostan, Russia. The population was 30 as of 2010. There are 2 streets.

== Geography ==
Sharipovo is located 63 km northeast of Uchaly (the district's administrative centre) by road. Kazhayevo is the nearest rural locality.
