= Ilchino =

Ilchino Ильчино
- Selo
- Location within Bashkortostan Location within Russia
- Coordinates: 54°25′N 59°32′E
- Country: Russia
- Region: Bashkortostan
- District: Uchalinsky District
- Time zone: UTC+5:00

Ilchino (Russian: Ильчино; Bashkir: Илсе, İlse) is a rural locality (a selo) and the administrative centre of Ilchinsky Selsoviet, Uchalinsky District, Bashkortostan, Russia. The population was 1,143 as of 2010. There are 25 streets.

== Geography ==
Ilchino is located 18 km northeast of Uchaly (the district's administrative centre) by road. Safarovo is the nearest rural locality.
