= Uzungulovo =

Uzungulovo Узунгулово
- Village
- Location within Bashkortostan Location within Russia
- Coordinates: 53°56′N 58°48′E
- Country: Russia
- Region: Bashkortostan
- District: Uchalinsky District
- Time zone: UTC+5:00

Uzungulovo (Russian: Узунгулово; Bashkir: Оҙонгүл, Oźongül) is a rural locality (a village) in Mindyaksky Selsoviet, Uchalinsky District, Bashkortostan, Russia. The population was 198 as of 2010. There are 8 streets.

== Geography ==
Uzungulovo is located 76 km southwest of Uchaly (the district's administrative centre) by road. Ozyorny is the nearest rural locality.
