= Iltebanovo =

Iltebanovo Ильтебаново
- Selo
- Location within Bashkortostan Location within Russia
- Coordinates: 54°20′N 59°15′E
- Country: Russia
- Region: Bashkortostan
- District: Uchalinsky District
- Time zone: UTC+5:00

Iltebanovo (Russian: Ильтебаново; Bashkir: Илтабан, İltaban) is a rural locality (a selo) in Kunakbayevsky Selsoviet, Uchalinsky District, Bashkortostan, Russia. The population was 480 as of 2010. There are 18 streets.

== Geography ==
Iltebanovo is located 10 km northwest of Uchaly (the district's administrative centre) by road. Kunakbayevo is the nearest rural locality.
