= Kubagushevo =

Kubagushevo Кубагушево
- Village
- Location within Bashkortostan Location within Russia
- Coordinates: 53°55′N 58°43′E
- Country: Russia
- Region: Bashkortostan
- District: Uchalinsky District
- Time zone: UTC+5:00

Kubagushevo (Russian: Кубагушево; Bashkir: Ҡобағош, Qobağoş) is a rural locality (a village) in Mindyaksky Selsoviet, Uchalinsky District, Bashkortostan, Russia. The population was 377 as of 2010. There are 12 streets.

== Geography ==
Kubagushevo is located 77 km southwest of Uchaly (the district's administrative centre) by road. Kazakkulovo is the nearest rural locality.
