= Suleymanovo, Uchalinsky District, Republic of Bashkortostan =

Suleymanovo Сулейманово
- Village
- Location within Bashkortostan Location within Russia
- Coordinates: 54°46′N 59°52′E
- Country: Russia
- Region: Bashkortostan
- District: Uchalinsky District
- Time zone: UTC+5:00

Suleymanovo (Russian: Сулейманово; Bashkir: Һөләймән, Höläymän) is a rural locality (a village) in Ilchigulovsky Selsoviet, Uchalinsky District, Bashkortostan, Russia. The population was 179 as of 2010. There are 4 streets.

== Geography ==
Suleymanovo is located 72 km northeast of Uchaly (the district's administrative centre) by road. Muldakayevo is the nearest rural locality.
