= Kuchukovo =

Kuchukovo Кучуково
- Village
- Location within Bashkortostan Location within Russia
- Coordinates: 54°50′N 59°54′E
- Country: Russia
- Region: Bashkortostan
- District: Uchalinsky District
- Time zone: UTC+5:00

Kuchukovo (Russian: Кучуково; Bashkir: Көсөк, Kösök) is a rural locality (a village) in Ilchigulovsky Selsoviet, Uchalinsky District, Bashkortostan, Russia. The population was 72 as of 2010. There are 5 streets.

== Geography ==
Kuchukovo is located 82 km northeast of Uchaly (the district's administrative centre) by road. Suyundyukovo is the nearest rural locality.
