= Ishkinovo =

Ishkinovo Ишкиново
- Village
- Location within Bashkortostan Location within Russia
- Coordinates: 54°10′N 59°10′E
- Country: Russia
- Region: Bashkortostan
- District: Uchalinsky District
- Time zone: UTC+5:00

Ishkinovo (Russian: Ишкиново; Bashkir: Ишкен, İşken) is a rural locality (a village) in Uralsky Selsoviet, Uchalinsky District, Bashkortostan, Russia. The population was 186 as of 2010. There are 5 streets.

== Geography ==
Ishkinovo is located 36 km southwest of Uchaly (the district's administrative centre) by road. Uralsk is the nearest rural locality.
