= Zaynulla Rasulev =

Bashkir religious leader (1833–1917)

- Зәйнулла Рәсүлев; Zəynulla Rəsül
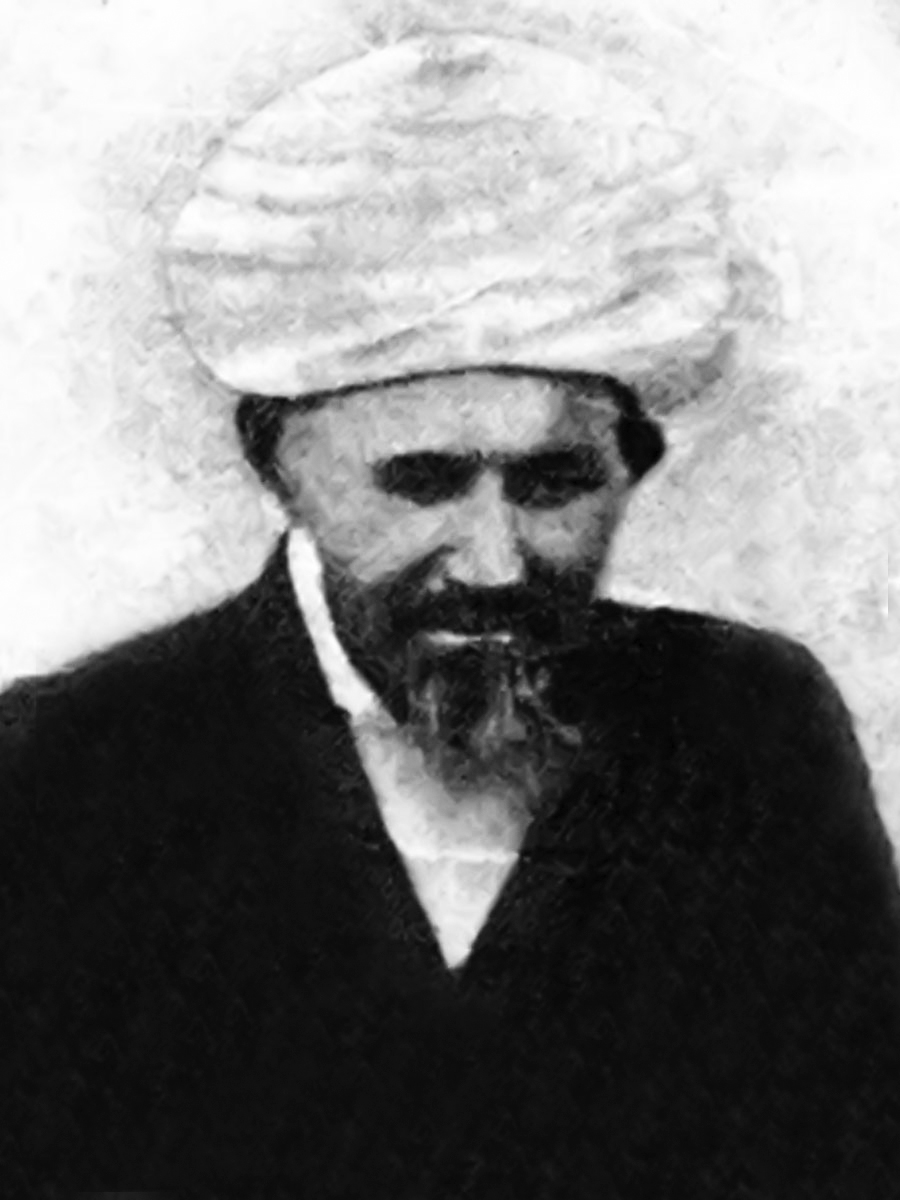
- Born: 25 March 1833; Sharip, Russian Empire
- Died: 2 February 1917 (aged 83); Troitsk, Russia
- Other name: Zeynullah Resûlî (Turkish)
- Occupation: Religious leader

Zaynulla Rasulev (Zaynulla bin Khabibulla bin Rasūl; Bashkir: Зәйнулла Рәсүлев, Russian: Зайнулла́ Расу́лев, 25 March 1833 – 2 February 1917) was a Bashkir religious leader in the 19th and early 20th century. Zaynulla is also embraced by the closely related Tatars as part of their religious legacy. Zaynulla is notable as one of the most important representatives of Jadidism and the organizer of one of the first Jadidi madrasah. Zaynulla belonged to the Naqshandi Sufi order.

== Life ==
Born in 1833 in the village of Sharip in Verkheuralsk province, Orenburg Governorate (these days in the Uchalinsky District, Republic of Bashkortostan, Russia) to the family of mullah of the local Islamic community. He received instruction in a madrasah in his home village, then in the madrasah in Troitsk. Upon instruction, he began a clerical career. Since 1858, he served as Imam and khatib in the village of Yuldash (currently in Uchalinsky District, Bashkortostan) .

While still in his student years, Zaynulla Rasulev (Zeynullah Resûlî in Turkish) became interested in Sufism. In 1859, he joined the Sufi order of Naqshbandi. He received individual instruction from sheikh Ahmed Ziyaüddin Gümüşhanevi in Istanbul in 1869–1870, from whom received the Ijazah, or the authorization to teach Sufi Naqshbandi's doctrine. He then made a hajj. After returning to Bashkortostan, he introduced several innovations into the local Sufi practices: singing zikr aloud, the observance of Mawlid, (the birthday of the Islamic prophet Muhammad), wearing prayer beads and more.

He endured persecution for preaching Sufism: the local conservative mullahs and the officials of mainstream Islam accused him of disseminating heresy and undermining activity aiming at the authorities in power. Upon their written denunciation, Zaynulla Rasulev got arrested and sent to exile. He served his exile successively in Zlatoust (eight months), Nikolsk, Vologda Oblast (1873–1876) and Kostroma (1876–1881).

In 1881, he returned from exile and resumed his activity as a religious leader in the village of Aqquzha in Bashkortostan. He did a second hajj. Since 1884, Rasulev took the post of the Imam of the town mosque in Troitsk. He subsequently founded the madrasah of Rasuliya, one of the first jadidi educational institution in the Urals. He had numerous disciples and followers, and became an influential Muslim leader in Russia.

Zaynulla Rasulev died on February 2, 1917. He is buried in the old Muslim cemetery in Troitsk.

Numerous legends are preserved in the Bashkir public memory about the miracles and healings performed by Zaynulla Rasulev.

His son, Gabdurakhman Rasulev, also became a Bashkir religious leader.

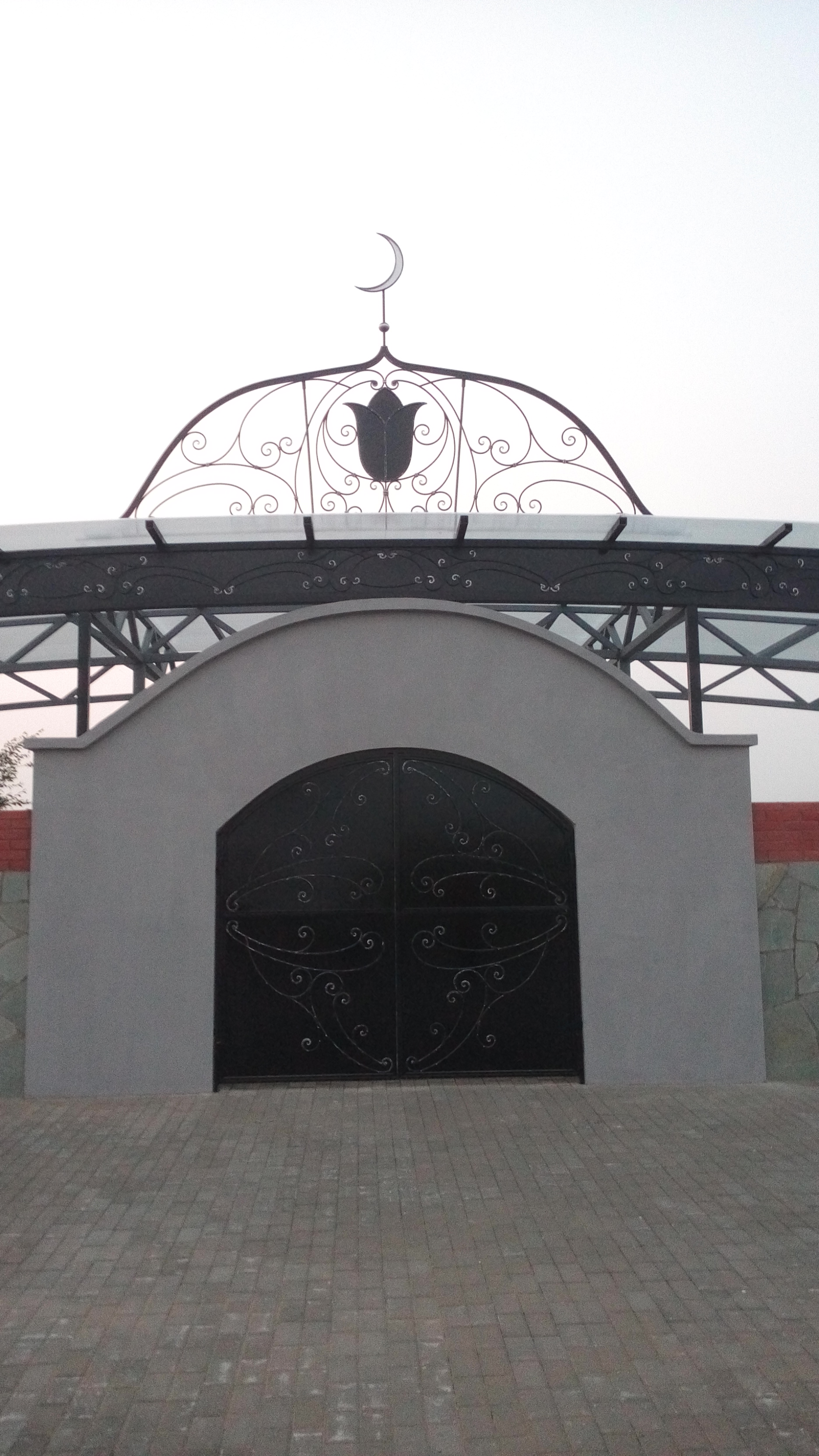
The entrance to the tomb of Zaynulla Rasulev

== Commemoration ==
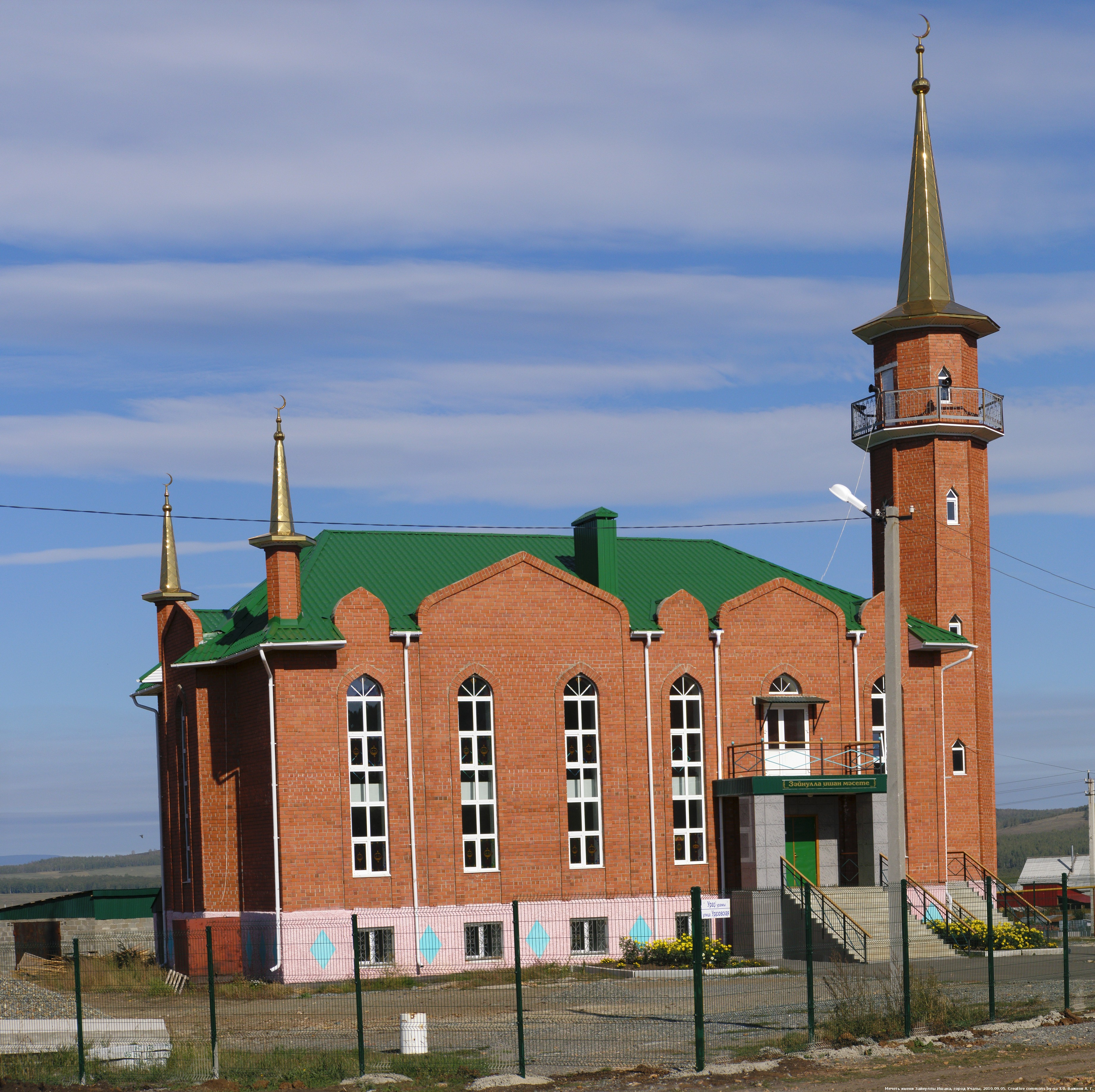
The mosque named after Zaynulla-Ishan in the town of Uchaly, Bashkortostan

- In 2009, a mosque was opened in the town of Uchaly, Bashkortostan, named after Zaynulla-Ishan.
- A street in Ufa, Russia was named after Zanulla Rasulev in 2008.
