= Malomuynakovo =

Malomuynakovo Маломуйнаково
- Village
- Location within Bashkortostan Location within Russia
- Coordinates: 54°33′N 59°33′E
- Country: Russia
- Region: Bashkortostan
- District: Uchalinsky District
- Time zone: UTC+5:00

Malomuynakovo (Russian: Маломуйнаково; Bashkir: Малай-Муйнаҡ, Malay-Muynaq) is a rural locality (a village) in Mansurovsky Selsoviet, Uchalinsky District, Bashkortostan, Russia. The population was 108 as of 2010. There are 3 streets.

== Geography ==
Malomuynakovo is located 36 km northeast of Uchaly (the district's administrative centre) by road. Abzakovo is the nearest rural locality.
