= Altyntash =

Altyntash Алтынташ
- Village
- Location within Bashkortostan Location within Russia
- Coordinates: 54°42′N 59°52′E
- Country: Russia
- Region: Bashkortostan
- District: Uchalinsky District
- Time zone: UTC+5:00

Altyntash (Russian: Алтынташ; Bashkir: Алтынташ, Altıntaş) is a rural locality (a village) in Ilchigulovsky Selsoviet, Uchalinsky District, Bashkortostan, Russia. The population was 13 as of 2010. There is 1 street.

== Geography ==
Altyntash is located 62 km northeast of Uchaly (the district's administrative centre) by road.
