= Kunakbayevo, Uchalinsky District, Republic of Bashkortostan =

Kunakbayevo Кунакбаево
- Selo
- Location within Bashkortostan Location within Russia
- Coordinates: 54°20′N 59°18′E
- Country: Russia
- Region: Bashkortostan
- District: Uchalinsky District
- Time zone: UTC+5:00

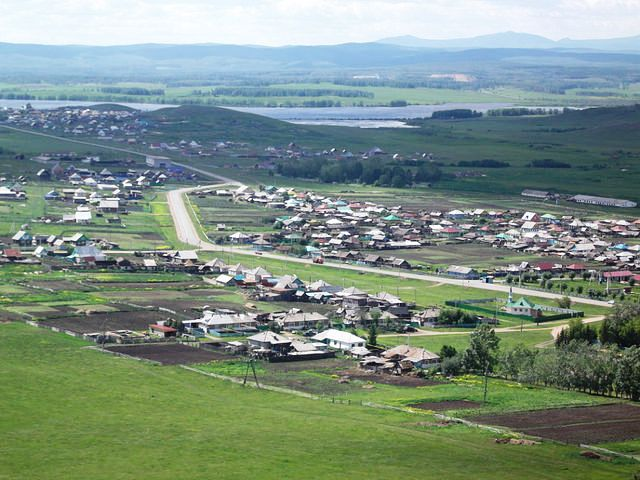
Aerial photograph of Kunakbayevo, Uchalinsky District, Republic of Bashkortostan

Kunakbayevo (Russian: Кунакбаево; Bashkir: Ҡунаҡбай, Qunaqbay) is a rural locality (a selo) and the administrative centre of Kunakbayevsky Selsoviet, Uchalinsky District, Bashkortostan, Russia. The population was 750 as of 2010. There are 27 streets.

== Geography ==
Kunakbayevo is located 7 km northwest of Uchaly (the district's administrative centre) by road. Iltebanovo is the nearest rural locality.
