= Kulushevo, Uchalinsky District, Republic of Bashkortostan =

Kulushevo Кулушево
- Village
- Location within Bashkortostan Location within Russia
- Coordinates: 54°12′N 58°59′E
- Country: Russia
- Region: Bashkortostan
- District: Uchalinsky District
- Time zone: UTC+5:00

Kulushevo (Russian: Кулушево; Bashkir: Ҡолош, Qoloş) is a rural locality (a village) in Urazovsky Selsoviet, Uchalinsky District, Bashkortostan, Russia. The population was 151 as of 2010. There are 6 streets.

== Geography ==
Kulushevo is located 37 km southwest of Uchaly (the district's administrative centre) by road. Kutuyevo is the nearest rural locality.
