= Muldakayevo, Uchalinsky District, Republic of Bashkortostan =

Muldakayevo Мулдакаево
- Village
- Location within Bashkortostan Location within Russia
- Coordinates: 54°45′N 59°49′E
- Country: Russia
- Region: Bashkortostan
- District: Uchalinsky District
- Time zone: UTC+5:00

Muldakayevo (Russian: Мулдакаево; Bashkir: Мулдаҡай, Muldaqay) is a rural locality (a village) in Ilchigulovsky Selsoviet, Uchalinsky District, Bashkortostan, Russia. The population was 253 as of 2010. There are 5 streets.

== Geography ==
Muldakayevo is located 65 km northeast of Uchaly (the district's administrative centre) by road. Ilchigulovo is the nearest rural locality.
