= Kiryabinskoye =

Kiryabinskoye Кирябинское
- Selo
- Location within Bashkortostan Location within Russia
- Coordinates: 54°33′N 59°15′E
- Country: Russia
- Region: Bashkortostan
- District: Uchalinsky District
- Time zone: UTC+5:00

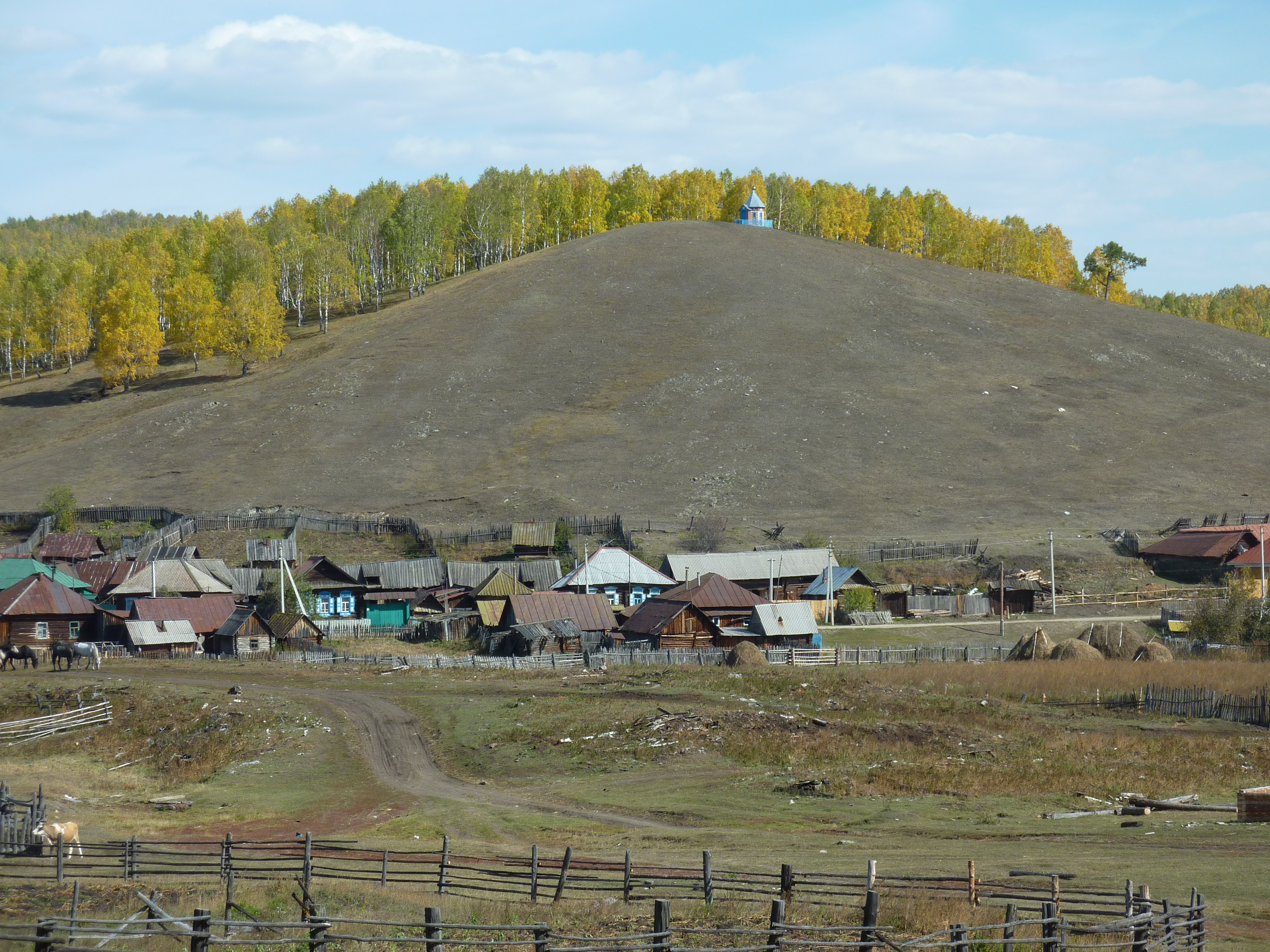
Kiryabinskoye

Kiryabinskoye (Russian: Кирябинское; Bashkir: Кирәбе, Kiräbe) is a rural locality (a selo) and the administrative centre of Kiryabinsky Selsoviet, Uchalinsky District, Bashkortostan, Russia. The population was 485 as of 2010. There are 15 streets.

== Geography ==
Kiryabinskoye is located 38 km northwest of Uchaly (the district's administrative centre) by road. Rysayevo is the nearest rural locality.
