= Tatlembetovo =

Tatlembetovo Татлембетово
- Village
- Location within Bashkortostan Location within Russia
- Coordinates: 54°36′N 59°28′E
- Country: Russia
- Region: Bashkortostan
- District: Uchalinsky District
- Time zone: UTC+5:00

Tatlembetovo (Russian: Татлембетово; Bashkir: Тәтлембәт, Tätlembät) is a rural locality (a village) in Mansurovsky Selsoviet, Uchalinsky District, Bashkortostan, Russia. The population was 22 as of 2010. There are 2 streets.

== Geography ==
Tatlembetovo is located 48 km north of Uchaly (the district's administrative centre) by road. Absalyamovo is the nearest rural locality.
