= Karimovo, Uchalinsky District, Republic of Bashkortostan =

Karimovo Каримово
- Village
- Location within Bashkortostan Location within Russia
- Coordinates: 54°41′N 59°48′E
- Country: Russia
- Region: Bashkortostan
- District: Uchalinsky District
- Time zone: UTC+5:00

Karimovo (Russian: Каримово; Bashkir: Кәрим, Kärim) is a rural locality (a village) in Ilchigulovsky Selsoviet, Uchalinsky District, Bashkortostan, Russia. The population was 270 as of 2010. There are 5 streets.

== Geography ==
Karimovo is located 56 km northeast of Uchaly (the district's administrative centre) by road. Altyntash is the nearest rural locality.
