= Kazakkulovo =

Kazakkulovo Казаккулово
- Village
- Location within Bashkortostan Location within Russia
- Coordinates: 53°58′N 58°46′E
- Country: Russia
- Region: Bashkortostan
- District: Uchalinsky District
- Time zone: UTC+5:00

Kazakkulovo (Russian: Казаккулово; Bashkir: Ҡаҙаҡҡол, Qaźaqqol) is a rural locality (a village) in Mindyaksky Selsoviet, Uchalinsky District, Bashkortostan, Russia. The population was 117 as of 2010. There are 4 streets.

== Geography ==
Kazakkulovo is located 71 km southwest of Uchaly (the district's administrative centre) by road. Kubagushevo is the nearest rural locality.
