= Mindyak =

Mindyak Миндяк
- Selo
- Location within Bashkortostan Location within Russia
- Coordinates: 54°01′N 58°47′E
- Country: Russia
- Region: Bashkortostan
- District: Uchalinsky District
- Time zone: UTC+5:00

Mindyak (Russian: Миндяк; Bashkir: Миндәк, Mindäk) is a rural locality (a selo) and the administrative centre of Mindyaksky Selsoviet, Uchalinsky District, Bashkortostan, Russia. The population was 2,282 as of 2010. There are 56 streets.

== Geography ==
Mindyak is located 69 km southwest of Uchaly (the district's administrative centre) by road. Karaguzhino is the nearest rural locality.
