= Ilchigulovo, Uchalinsky District, Republic of Bashkortostan =

Ilchigulovo Ильчигулово
- Village
- Location within Bashkortostan Location within Russia
- Coordinates: 54°45′N 59°48′E
- Country: Russia
- Region: Bashkortostan
- District: Uchalinsky District
- Time zone: UTC+5:00

Ilchigulovo (Russian: Ильчигулово; Bashkir: Илсеғол, İlseğol) is a rural locality (a village) and the administrative centre of Ilchigulovsky Selsoviet, Uchalinsky District, Bashkortostan, Russia. The population was 242 as of 2010. There are 5 streets.

== Geography ==
Ilchigulovo is located 66 km northeast of Uchaly (the district's administrative centre) by road. Orlovka is the nearest rural locality.
