= Kubyakovo =

Kubyakovo Кубяково
- Village
- Location within Bashkortostan Location within Russia
- Coordinates: 54°21′N 59°04′E
- Country: Russia
- Region: Bashkortostan
- District: Uchalinsky District
- Time zone: UTC+5:00

Kubyakovo (Bashkir: Көбәк, Köbäk; Russian: Кубяково) is a rural locality (a village) in Kunakbayevsky Selsoviet, Uchalinsky District, Bashkortostan, Russia. The population was 12 as of 2010. There is one street.

== Geography ==
Kubyakovo is located 25 km west of Uchaly (the district's administrative centre) by road. Iltebanovo is the nearest rural locality.
