= Uchaly (selo) =

Uchaly Учалы
- Selo
- Location within Bashkortostan Location within Russia
- Coordinates: 54°21′N 59°26′E
- Country: Russia
- Region: Bashkortostan
- District: Uchalinsky District
- Time zone: UTC+5:00

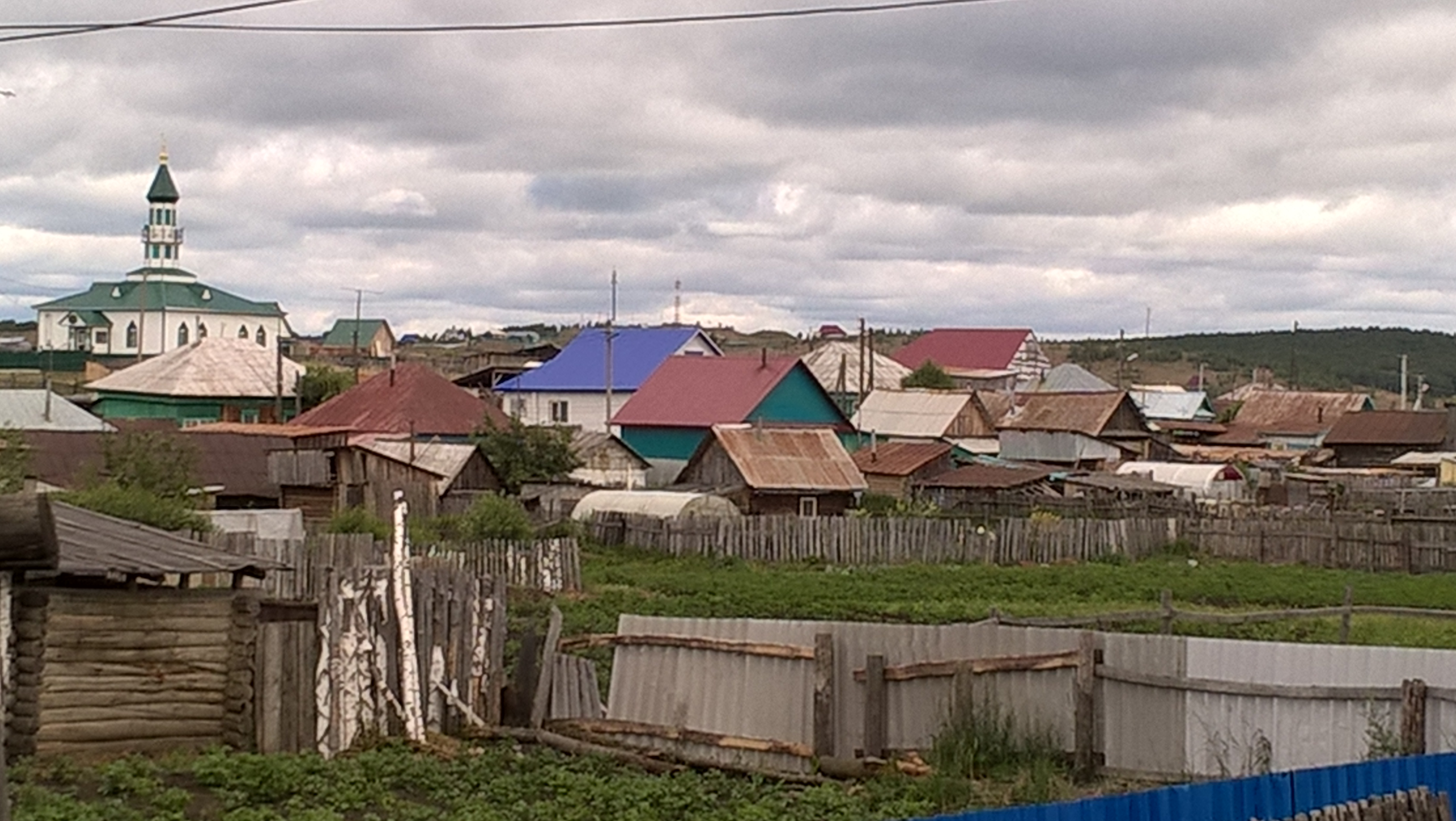

Uchaly (Russian: Учалы; Bashkir: Учалы, Uçalı) is a rural locality (a selo) and the administrative centre of Uchalinsky Selsoviet, Uchalinsky District, Bashkortostan, Russia. The population was 6,049 as of 2010. There are 90 streets.

== Geography ==
Uchaly is located 8 km northeast of Uchaly (the district's administrative centre) by road. Barvikha is the nearest rural locality.
