= Aslayevo, Uchalinsky District, Republic of Bashkortostan =

Aslayevo Аслаево
- Village
- Location within Bashkortostan Location within Russia
- Coordinates: 53°55′N 58°55′E
- Country: Russia
- Region: Bashkortostan
- District: Uchalinsky District
- Time zone: UTC+5:00

Aslayevo (Russian: Аслаево; Bashkir: Аһылай, Ahılay) is a rural locality (a village) in Mindyaksky Selsoviet, Uchalinsky District, Bashkortostan, Russia. The population was 39 as of 2010. There is 1 street.

== Geography ==
Aslayevo is located 85 km southwest of Uchaly (the district's administrative centre) by road. Battalovo and Vyatsky are the nearest rural localities.
