= Saytakovo =

Saytakovo Сайтаково
- Village
- Location within Bashkortostan Location within Russia
- Coordinates: 54°20′N 59°33′E
- Country: Russia
- Region: Bashkortostan
- District: Uchalinsky District
- Time zone: UTC+5:00

Saytakovo (Russian: Сайтаково; Bashkir: Һәйтәк, Häytäk) is a rural locality (a village) in Uchalinsky Selsoviet, Uchalinsky District, Bashkortostan, Russia. The population was 351 as of 2010. There are 6 streets.

== Geography ==
Saytakovo is located 18 km east of Uchaly (the district's administrative centre) by road. Uchaly is the nearest rural locality.
