= Suyargulovo =

Suyargulovo Суяргулово
- Village
- Location within Bashkortostan Location within Russia
- Coordinates: 54°05′N 58°59′E
- Country: Russia
- Region: Bashkortostan
- District: Uchalinsky District
- Time zone: UTC+5:00

Suyargulovo (Russian: Суяргулово; Bashkir: Һөйәрғол, Höyärğol) is a rural locality (a village) in Novobayramgulovsky Selsoviet, Uchalinsky District, Bashkortostan, Russia. The population was 90 as of 2010. There are 3 streets.

== Geography ==
Suyargulovo is located 50 km southwest of Uchaly (the district's administrative centre) by road. Kaluyevo is the nearest rural locality.
