= Urgunovo =

Urgunovo Ургуново
- Selo
- Location within Bashkortostan Location within Russia
- Coordinates: 54°23′N 59°23′E
- Country: Russia
- Region: Bashkortostan
- District: Uchalinsky District
- Time zone: UTC+5:00

Urgunovo (Russian: Ургуново; Bashkir: Өргөн, Örgön) is a rural locality (a selo) in Uchalinsky Selsoviet, Uchalinsky District, Bashkortostan, Russia. The population was 569 as of 2010. There are 11 streets.

== Geography ==
Urgunovo is located 13 km north of Uchaly (the district's administrative centre) by road. Uchaly is the nearest rural locality.
