= Moskovo, Uchalinsky District, Republic of Bashkortostan =

Moskovo Москово
- Village
- Location within Bashkortostan Location within Russia
- Coordinates: 53°58′N 59°06′E
- Country: Russia
- Region: Bashkortostan
- District: Uchalinsky District
- Time zone: UTC+5:00

Moskovo (Russian: Москово; Bashkir: Мәҫкәү, Mäśkäw) is a rural locality (a village) in Nauruzovsky Selsoviet, Uchalinsky District, Bashkortostan, Russia. The population was 409 as of 2010. There are 4 streets.

== Geography ==
Moskovo is located 60 km southwest of Uchaly (the district's administrative centre) by road. Mishkino is the nearest rural locality.
