= Urazovo, Republic of Bashkortostan =

Urazovo Уразово
- Selo
- Location within Bashkortostan Location within Russia
- Coordinates: 54°16′N 59°08′E
- Country: Russia
- Region: Bashkortostan
- District: Uchalinsky District
- Time zone: UTC+5:00

Urazovo (Russian: Уразово; Bashkir: Ураҙ, Uraź) is a rural locality (a selo) and the administrative centre of Urazovsky Selsoviet, Uchalinsky District, Bashkortostan, Russia. The population was 1,051 as of 2010. There are 19 streets.

== Geography ==
Urazovo is located 22 km southwest of Uchaly (the district's administrative centre) by road.
