= Kidysh =

Kidysh Кидыш
- Village
- Location within Bashkortostan Location within Russia
- Coordinates: 54°13′N 59°42′E
- Country: Russia
- Region: Bashkortostan
- District: Uchalinsky District
- Time zone: UTC+5:00

Kidysh (Russian: Кидыш; Bashkir: Ҡыйҙыш, Qıyźış) is a rural locality (a village) in Akhunovsky Selsoviet, Uchalinsky District, Bashkortostan, Russia. The population was 119 as of 2010. There are 3 streets.

== Geography ==
Kidysh is located 31 km southeast of Uchaly (the district's administrative centre) by road. Akhunovo is the nearest rural locality.
