= Yagudino =

Yagudino Ягудино
- Village
- Location within Bashkortostan Location within Russia
- Coordinates: 54°01′N 59°05′E
- Country: Russia
- Region: Bashkortostan
- District: Uchalinsky District
- Time zone: UTC+5:00

Yagudino (Russian: Ягудино; Bashkir: Йәһүҙә, Yähüźä) is a rural locality (a village) in Nauruzovsky Selsoviet, Uchalinsky District, Bashkortostan, Russia. The population was 26 as of 2010. There is 1 street.

== Geography ==
Yagudino is located 67 km southwest of Uchaly (the district's administrative centre) by road. Nauruzovo is the nearest rural locality.
