= Aznashevo =

Aznashevo Азнашево
- Village
- Location within Bashkortostan Location within Russia
- Coordinates: 54°41′N 59°35′E
- Country: Russia
- Region: Bashkortostan
- District: Uchalinsky District
- Time zone: UTC+5:00

Aznashevo (Russian: Азнашево; Bashkir: Аҙнаш, Aźnaş) is a rural locality (a village) in Tungatarovsky Selsoviet, Uchalinsky District, Bashkortostan, Russia. The population was 11 as of 2010. There is 1 street.

== Geography ==
Aznashevo is located 59 km northeast of Uchaly (the district's administrative centre) by road. Kazhayevo is the nearest rural locality.
