= Ishmekeyevo =

Ishmekeyevo Ишмекеево
- Village
- Location within Bashkortostan Location within Russia
- Coordinates: 54°12′N 59°06′E
- Country: Russia
- Region: Bashkortostan
- District: Uchalinsky District
- Time zone: UTC+5:00

Ishmekeyevo (Russian: Ишмекеево; Bashkir: Ишмәкәй, İşmäkäy) is a rural locality (a village) in Urazovsky Selsoviet, Uchalinsky District, Bashkortostan, Russia. The population was 251 as of 2010. There are 5 streets.

== Geography ==
Ishmekeyevo is located 32 km southwest of Uchaly (the district's administrative centre) by road. Bazargulovo is the nearest rural locality.
