= Kaipkulovo =

Kaipkulovo Каипкулово
- Village
- Location within Bashkortostan Location within Russia
- Coordinates: 54°06′N 59°00′E
- Country: Russia
- Region: Bashkortostan
- District: Uchalinsky District
- Time zone: UTC+5:00

Kaipkulovo (Russian: Каипкулово; Bashkir: Ҡәйепҡол, Qäyepqol) is a rural locality (a village) in Novobayramgulovsky Selsoviet, Uchalinsky District, Bashkortostan, Russia. The population was 107 as of 2010. There are 4 streets.

== Geography ==
Kaipkulovo is located 50 km southwest of Uchaly (the district's administrative centre) by road. Novobayramgulovo is the nearest rural locality.
