= Abdulkasimovo =

Abdulkasimovo Абдулкасимово Абдулҡасим Abdulqasim
- Village
- Location within Bashkortostan Location within Russia
- Coordinates: 54°26′N 59°12′E
- Country: Russia
- Region: Bashkortostan
- District: Uchalinsky District
- Time zone: [[UTC+5:00]]

Abdulkasimovo (Russian: Абдулкасимово; Bashkir: Абдулҡасим, Abdulqasim) is a rural locality (a village) in Kunakbayevsky Selsoviet of Uchalinsky District, Bashkortostan, Russia. The population was 15 as of 2010. There are 2 streets.

== Geography ==
Abdulkasimovo is located 19 km northwest of Uchaly (the district's administrative centre) by road. Yuldashevo is the nearest rural locality.

== Ethnicity ==
The village is inhabited by Bashkirs.
