= Battalovo =

Battalovo Батталово
- Village
- Location within Bashkortostan Location within Russia
- Coordinates: 53°53′N 58°52′E
- Country: Russia
- Region: Bashkortostan
- District: Uchalinsky District
- Time zone: UTC+5:00

Battalovo (Russian: Батталово; Bashkir: Баттал, Battal) is a rural locality (a village) in Mindyaksky Selsoviet, Uchalinsky District, Bashkortostan, Russia. The population was 316 as of 2010. There are 6 streets.

== Geography ==
Battalovo is located 83 km southwest of Uchaly (the district's administrative centre) by road. Ozyorny and Uzungulovo are the nearest rural localities.
