= Kurama, Uchalinsky District, Republic of Bashkortostan =

Kurama Курама
- Village
- Location within Bashkortostan Location within Russia
- Coordinates: 54°37′N 59°47′E
- Country: Russia
- Region: Bashkortostan
- District: Uchalinsky District
- Time zone: UTC+5:00

Kurama (Russian: Курама; Bashkir: Ҡорама, Qorama) is a rural locality (a village) in Tungatarovsky Selsoviet, Uchalinsky District, Bashkortostan, Russia. The population was 505 as of 2010. There are 8 streets.

== Geography ==
Kurama is located 48 km northeast of Uchaly (the district's administrative centre) by road. Komsomolsk is the nearest rural locality.
