= Amangildino, Uchalinsky District, Republic of Bashkortostan =

Amangildino Амангильдино
- Village
- Location within Bashkortostan Location within Russia
- Coordinates: 54°03′N 58°52′E
- Country: Russia
- Region: Bashkortostan
- District: Uchalinsky District
- Time zone: UTC+5:00

Amangildino (Russian: Амангильдино; Bashkir: Амангилде, Amangilde) is a rural locality (a village) in Amangildinsky Selsoviet, Uchalinsky District, Bashkortostan, Russia. The population was 110 as of 2010. There are 3 streets.

== Geography ==
Amangildino is located 59 km southwest of Uchaly (the district's administrative centre) by road. Malokazakkulovo is the nearest rural locality.
