= Imangulovo, Uchalinsky District, Republic of Bashkortostan =

Imangulovo Имангулово
- Selo
- Location within Bashkortostan Location within Russia
- Coordinates: 54°16′N 59°19′E
- Country: Russia
- Region: Bashkortostan
- District: Uchalinsky District
- Time zone: UTC+5:00

Imangulovo (Russian: Имангулово; Bashkir: Иманғол, İmanğol) is a rural locality (a selo) and the administrative centre of Imangulovsky Selsoviet, Uchalinsky District, Bashkortostan, Russia. The population was 861 as of 2010. There are 14 streets.

== Geography ==
Imangulovo is located 8 km southwest of Uchaly (the district's administrative centre) by road. Yuzhny is the nearest rural locality.
