= Buyda =

Buyda Буйда
- Selo
- Location within Bashkortostan Location within Russia
- Coordinates: 54°15′N 59°30′E
- Country: Russia
- Region: Bashkortostan
- District: Uchalinsky District
- Time zone: UTC+5:00

Buyda (Russian: Буйда; Bashkir: Бөйҙө, Böyźö) is a rural locality (a selo) and the administrative centre of Buydinsky Selsoviet, Uchalinsky District, Bashkortostan, Russia. The population was 764 as of 2010. There are 12 streets.

== Geography ==
Buyda is located 15 km southeast of Uchaly (the district's administrative centre) by road. Uchaly-2 is the nearest rural locality.
