= Oktyabrsk, Uchalinsky District, Republic of Bashkortostan =

Oktyabrsk Октябрьск
- Village
- Location within Bashkortostan Location within Russia
- Coordinates: 54°05′N 59°13′E
- Country: Russia
- Region: Bashkortostan
- District: Uchalinsky District
- Time zone: UTC+5:00

Oktyabrsk (Russian: Октябрьск) is a rural locality (a village) in Uralsky Selsoviet, Uchalinsky District, Bashkortostan, Russia. The population was 234 as of 2010. There are 6 streets.

== Geography ==
Oktyabrsk is located 47 km southwest of Uchaly (the district's administrative centre) by road. Uralsk is the nearest rural locality.
