= Starobalbukovo =

Starobalbukovo Старобалбуково
- Village
- Location within Bashkortostan Location within Russia
- Coordinates: 54°39′N 59°40′E
- Country: Russia
- Region: Bashkortostan
- District: Uchalinsky District

Population (2010)
  - Total: 166
- Time zone: UTC+5:00

Starobalbukovo (Russian: Старобалбуково; Bashkir: Балбуҡ, Balbuq) is a rural locality (a village) in Tungatarovsky Selsoviet, Uchalinsky District, Bashkortostan, Russia. The population was 166 as of 2010. There are 2 streets.

== Geography ==
Starobalbukovo is located 50 km northeast of Uchaly (the district's administrative centre) by road. Polyakovka is the nearest rural locality.
