= Komsomolsk, Republic of Bashkortostan =

Komsomolsk Комсомольск
- Selo
- Location within Bashkortostan Location within Russia
- Coordinates: 54°37′N 59°43′E
- Country: Russia
- Region: Bashkortostan
- District: Uchalinsky District
- Time zone: UTC+5:00

Komsomolsk (Russian: Комсомольск) is a rural locality (a selo) and the administrative centre of Tungatarovsky Selsoviet, Uchalinsky District, Bashkortostan, Russia. The population was 433 as of 2010. There are 6 streets.

== Geography ==
Komsomolsk is located 45 kilometres (28 mi) northeast of Uchaly (the district's administrative centre) by road. Tungatarovo is the nearest rural locality.
