= Rasulevo =

Rasulevo Расулево
- Village
- Location within Bashkortostan Location within Russia
- Coordinates: 54°12′N 59°14′E
- Country: Russia
- Region: Bashkortostan
- District: Uchalinsky District
- Time zone: UTC+5:00

Rasulevo (Russian: Расулево; Bashkir: Рәсүл, Räsül) is a rural locality (a village) in Imangulovsky Selsoviet, Uchalinsky District, Bashkortostan, Russia. The population was 292 as of 2010. There are 7 streets.

== Geography ==
Rasulevo is located 17 km southwest of Uchaly (the district's administrative centre) by road. Kudashevo is the nearest rural locality.
