= Safarovo, Uchalinsky District, Republic of Bashkortostan =

Safarovo Сафарово
- Selo
- Location within Bashkortostan Location within Russia
- Coordinates: 54°26′N 59°33′E
- Country: Russia
- Region: Bashkortostan
- District: Uchalinsky District
- Time zone: UTC+5:00

Safarovo (Russian: Сафарово; Bashkir: Сәфәр, Säfär) is a rural locality (a selo) and the administrative centre of Safarovsky Selsoviet, Uchalinsky District, Bashkortostan, Russia. The population was 1,410 as of 2010. There are 18 streets.

== Geography ==
Safarovo is located 21 km northeast of Uchaly (the district's administrative centre) by road. Ilchino is the nearest rural locality.
