= Kaluyevo =

Kaluyevo Калуево
- Village
- Location within Bashkortostan Location within Russia
- Coordinates: 54°04′N 58°57′E
- Country: Russia
- Region: Bashkortostan
- District: Uchalinsky District
- Time zone: UTC+5:00

Kaluyevo (Russian: Калуево; Bashkir: Ҡалуй, Qaluy) is a rural locality (a village) in Amangildinsky Selsoviet, Uchalinsky District, Bashkortostan, Russia. The population was 134 as of 2010. There are 3 streets.

== Geography ==
Kaluyevo is located 53 km southwest of Uchaly (the district's administrative centre) by road. Malokazakkulovo is the nearest rural locality.
