= Suramanovo =

Suramanovo Сураманово
- Village
- Location within Bashkortostan Location within Russia
- Coordinates: 54°01′N 59°00′E
- Country: Russia
- Region: Bashkortostan
- District: Uchalinsky District
- Time zone: UTC+5:00

Suramanovo (Russian: Сураманово; Bashkir: Сораман, Soraman) is a rural locality (a village) in Amangildinsky Selsoviet, Uchalinsky District, Bashkortostan, Russia. The population was 291 as of 2010. There are 5 streets.

== Geography ==
Suramanovo is located 62 km southwest of Uchaly (the district's administrative centre) by road. Kuchukovo-Mayak is the nearest rural locality.
