= Galiakhmerovo =

Galiakhmerovo Галиахмерово
- Village
- Location within Bashkortostan Location within Russia
- Coordinates: 54°01′N 58°52′E
- Country: Russia
- Region: Bashkortostan
- District: Uchalinsky District
- Time zone: UTC+5:00

Galiakhmerovo (Russian: Галиахмерово; Bashkir: Ғәлиәхмәр, Ğäliäxmär) is a rural locality (a village) in Amangildinsky Selsoviet, Uchalinsky District, Bashkortostan, Russia. The population was 124 as of 2010. There are 2 streets.

== Geography ==
Galiakhmerovo is located 62 km southwest of Uchaly (the district's administrative centre) by road. Mindyak is the nearest rural locality.
