= Karaguzhino =

Karaguzhino Карагужино
- Village
- Location within Bashkortostan Location within Russia
- Coordinates: 53°59′N 58°46′E
- Country: Russia
- Region: Bashkortostan
- District: Uchalinsky District
- Time zone: UTC+5:00

Karaguzhino (Russian: Карагужино; Bashkir: Ҡарағужа, Qarağuja) is a rural locality (a village) in Mindyaksky Selsoviet, Uchalinsky District, Bashkortostan, Russia. The population was 79 as of 2010. There are 7 streets.

== Geography ==
Karaguzhino is located 71 km southwest of Uchaly (the district's administrative centre) by road. Mindyak is the nearest rural locality.
