= Kazhayevo =

Kazhayevo Кажаево
- Village
- Location within Bashkortostan Location within Russia
- Coordinates: 54°41′N 59°36′E
- Country: Russia
- Region: Bashkortostan
- District: Uchalinsky District
- Time zone: UTC+5:00

Kazhayevo (Russian: Кажаево; Bashkir: Ҡужай, Qujay) is a rural locality (a village) in Tungatarovsky Selsoviet, Uchalinsky District, Bashkortostan, Russia. The population was 57 as of 2010. There are 2 streets.

== Geography ==
Kazhayevo is located 60 km northeast of Uchaly (the district's administrative centre) by road. Aznashevo is the nearest rural locality.
