= Muldashevo =

Village in Bashkortostan, Russia

Muldashevo Мулдашево
- Village
- Location within Bashkortostan Location within Russia
- Coordinates: 54°50′N 59°47′E
- Country: Russia
- Region: Bashkortostan
- District: Uchalinsky District
- Time zone: UTC+5:00

Muldashevo (Russian: Мулдашево; Bashkir: Мулдаш, Muldaş) is a rural locality (a village) in Ilchigulovsky Selsoviet, Uchalinsky District, Bashkortostan, Russia. The population was 81 as of 2010. There are 3 streets.

== Geography ==
Muldashevo is located 74 km northeast of Uchaly (the district's administrative centre) by road. Muldakayevo is the nearest rural locality.
