= Rysayevo =

Rysayevo Рысаево
- Selo
- Location within Bashkortostan Location within Russia
- Coordinates: 54°28′N 59°23′E
- Country: Russia
- Region: Bashkortostan
- District: Uchalinsky District
- Time zone: UTC+5:00

Rysayevo (Russian: Рысаево; Bashkir: Рысай, Rısay) is a rural locality (a selo) in Ilchinsky Selsoviet, Uchalinsky District, Bashkortostan, Russia. The population was 563 as of 2010. There are 9 streets.

== Geography ==
Rysayevo is located 26 km north of Uchaly (the district's administrative centre) by road. Kalkanovo is the nearest rural locality.
