= Uchaly Mining and Metallurgical Combine =

OJSC Uchaly Mining and Metallurgical Combine
- Company type: Public (OAO)
- Industry: Metals, Mining
- Founded: 1968
- Headquarters: Uchaly, Bashkortostan, Russia
- Key people: Zakariya Gibadullin, General Director
- Products: Copper zinc concentrate, Coal Precious metals (gold, silver)
- Parent: Ural Mining and Metallurgical Company
- Website: ugok.ugmk.com/en/

Uchaly Mining and Metallurgical Combine (UMMC or UGOK Russian: Открытое акционерное общество «Учалинский горно-обогатительный комбинат», Bashkir: «Учалы тау-байыҡтырыу комбинаты» Асыҡ акционерҙар йәмғиәте) is a Russian metallurgical combine based in Uchaly, Bashkortostan. In 2016, UMMC incorporated Chelyabinsk Zinc Plant (CZP) and became the largest producer of zinc concentrate in Russia.

== Gallery ==
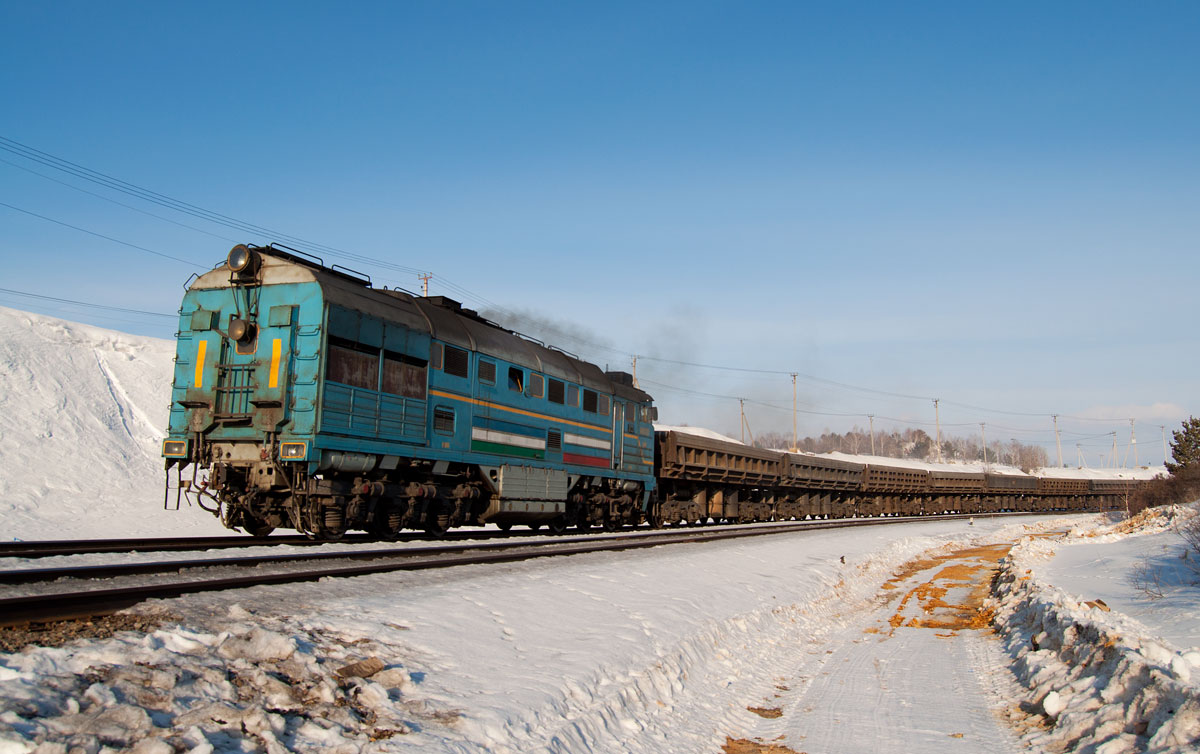
The lokomotiv 2ТЭ116-1106 of the Uchaly Mining and Metallurgical Combine in Rudnaya station (Uchalinsky District)

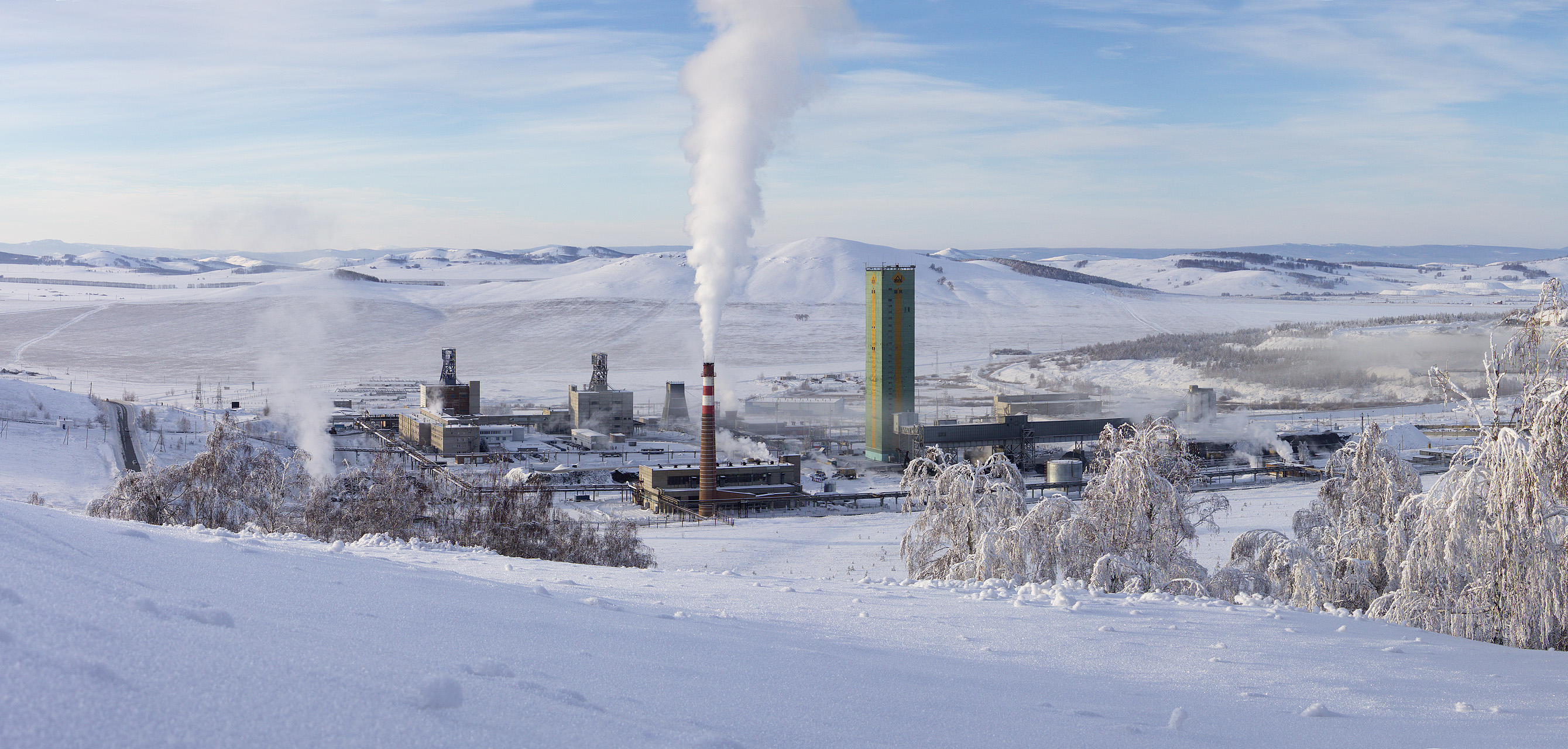
One of the few mines in Verkhneuralsky District
