= Zaynulla Rasulev Mosque =

Mosque in Bashkortostan, Russia

Coordinates: 54.3314°N 59.3775°E

Zaynulla Rasulev Mosque Мечеть имени Зайнуллы Ишана
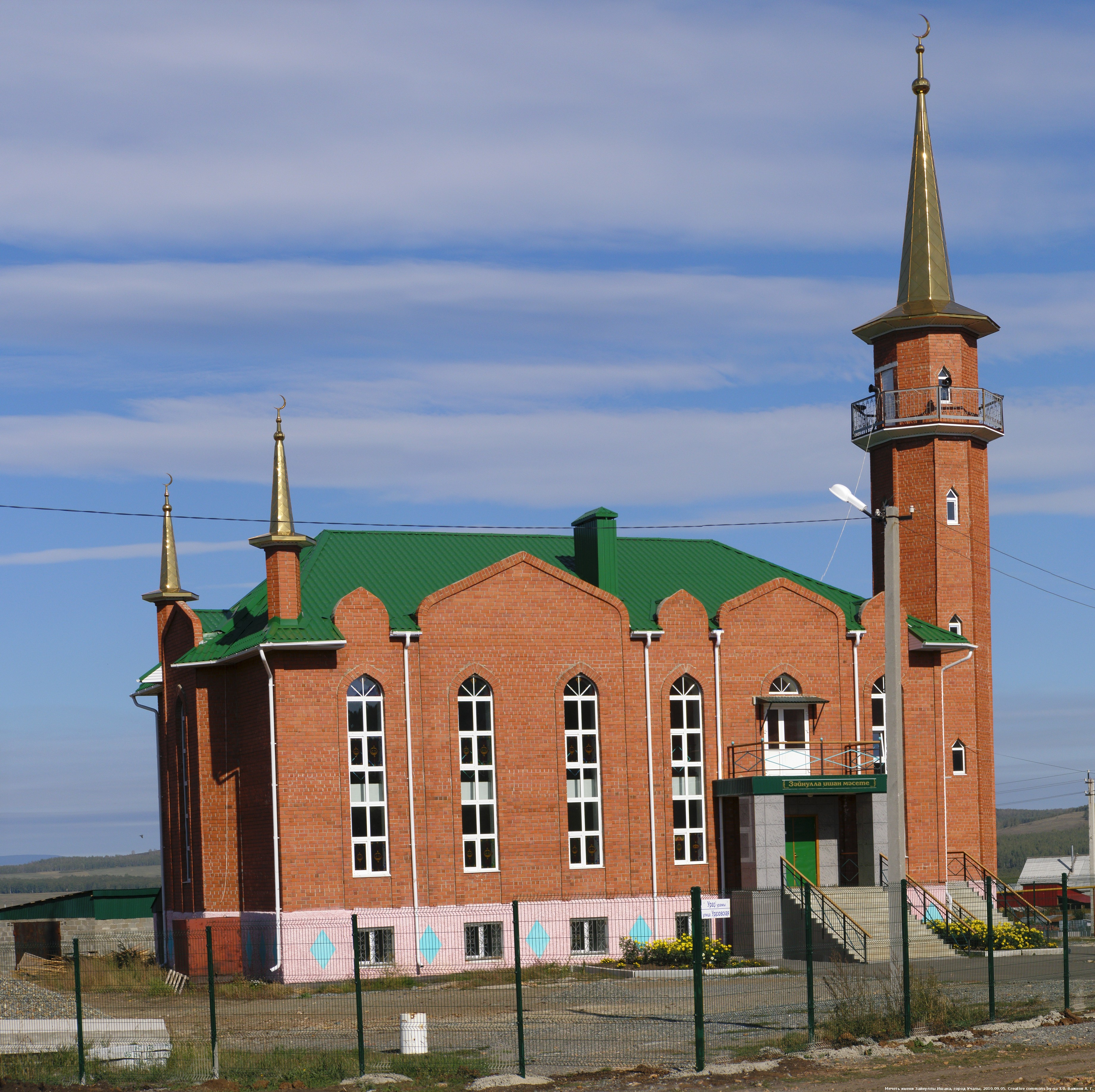
- The Mosque located in The Tzarskoe selo district, Uchaly

Religion
- Affiliation: Islam

Location
- Location: Uchaly, Bashkortostan, Russia
- Interactive map of Zaynulla Rasulev Mosque; Мечеть имени Зайнуллы Ишана

Architecture
- Type: Mosque
- Style: Modernist
- Established: 2009
- Minaret: 1

Zaynulla Rasulev Mosque (Russian: Мечеть имени Зайнуллы Ишана) in Tzarskoe selo district is one of the mosques in the town Uchaly, Bashkortostan, Russia.

It is named after Zaynulla Rasulev.

== See also ==
- Islam in Russia
- List of mosques in Russia
- List of mosques in Europe
