= Uchaly Mosque =

Mosque in Uchaly, Bashkortostan, Russia

Coordinates: 54.312222°N 59.371944°E

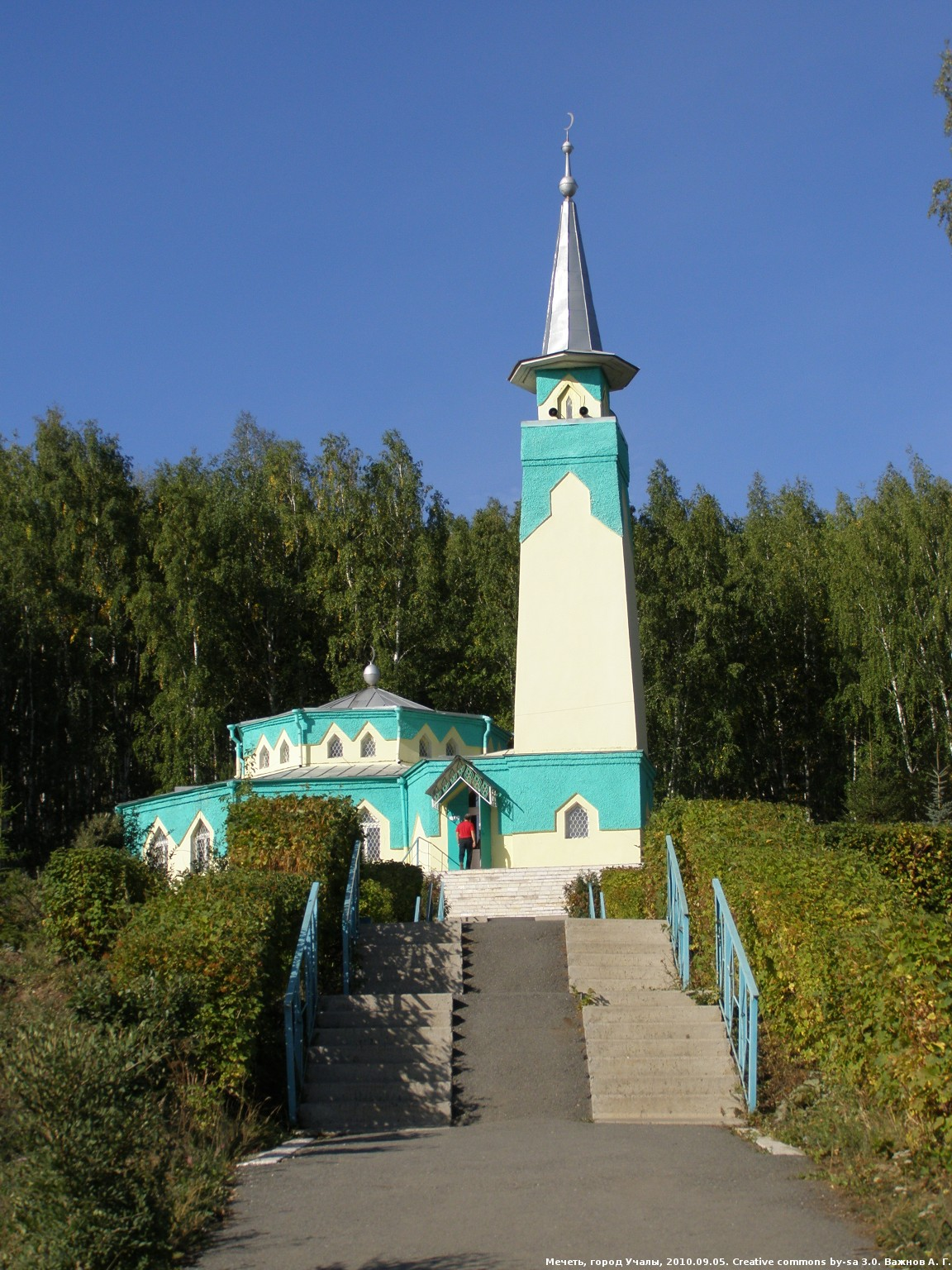
- The Mosque located on Tashbiek mountain, Uchaly

Religion
- Affiliation: Islam

Location
- Location: Uchaly, Bashkortostan, Russia
- Interactive map of Uchaly Mosque

Architecture
- Type: Mosque
- Style: Modernist
- Established: 1990s
- Minaret: 1

Uchaly Mosque on Tashbiek mountain is a mosque in Uchaly, Bashkortostan, Russia. It is located opposite to the Uchaly Public hospital.

== See also ==
- Islam in Russia
- List of mosques in Russia
- List of mosques in Europe
