= Uchaly (town) =

Town in the Republic of Bashkortostan, Russia

Uchaly Учалы
- Town

Other transcription(s)
  - Bashkir: Учалы
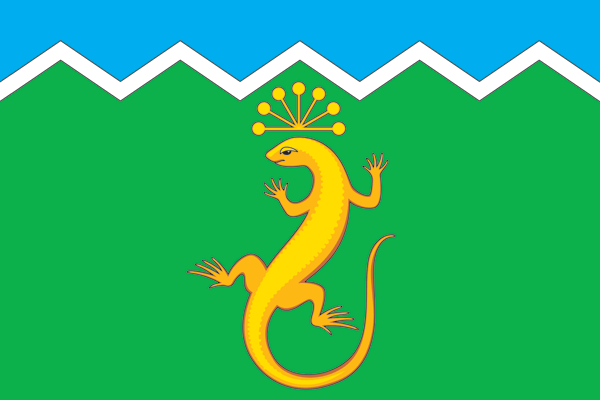
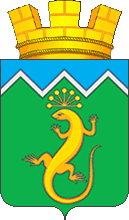
- Flag Coat of arms
- Interactive map of Uchaly
- Location of Uchaly Uchaly (Bashkortostan)
- Coordinates: 54°19′00″N 59°23′00″E
- Country: Russia
- Federal subject: Bashkortostan
- Founded: 1955

Area
  - Total: 56 km^{2} (22 sq mi)
- Elevation: 540 m (1,770 ft)

Population
  - Estimate (2021): 36,175 )

Administrative status
  - Subordinated to: town of republic significance of Uchaly
  - Capital of: Uchalinsky District, town of republic significance of Uchaly

Municipal status
  - Municipal district: Uchalinsky Municipal District
  - Urban settlement: Uchaly Urban Settlement
  - Capital of: Uchalinsky Municipal District, Uchaly Urban Settlement
- Time zone: UTC+5 (MSK+2)
- Postal code: 453700–453703
- OKTMO ID: 80653101001

Uchaly (Russian: Учалы́; Bashkir: Учалы, Uçalı) is a town in the Republic of Bashkortostan, Russia, in the east of the republic, in the southern Urals, among the lakes of the Uraltau Range. Population: 35,915 (2025 estimate); 40,491 (2010 census).

== Etymology ==
In the Bashkir language, "Uchaly" (Bashkir: Үс алды) literally means "revenge". According to a legend, at the end of the 14th century in the place where the modern town now stands Timur fought the Golden Horde Khan Tokhtamysh and slaughtered the nomadic South Ural Bashkirs who were Tokhtamysh's supporters. Another theory postulates that the town is named for the nearby lakes: Bolshiye Uchaly and Malye Uchaly. Several theories exist about the origins of the lakes' names as well. Bashkir geologists believe that the name of the lakes comes from the word yushaly, which, in turn, is derived from yusha—a generic Bashkir name for the color range of the sand and clay deposits, which in the past were used to manufacture paint. Another possibility is that the word yushaly derives from the word yusha, meaning "jasper", the deposits of which are common in the Urals. Finally, another version states that the name of the lakes derives from the Tatar word achuly, meaning "angry".

== History ==
The Malye Uchaly-II was discovered near the city. More than six thousand years ago, on a high steep cliff, a tribe of anglers cut down a stone pit for housing in a stone. It is covered on top by logs, a center is built inside, around which fragments of vessels from clay and various tools from jasper, flint, rock crystal and topaz are found.

== Administrative and municipal status ==
Within the framework of administrative divisions, Uchaly serves as the administrative center of Uchalinsky District, even though it is not a part of it. As an administrative division, it is incorporated separately as the town of republic significance of Uchaly—an administrative unit with the status equal to that of a district. As a municipal division, the town of republic significance of Uchaly is incorporated within Uchalinsky Municipal District as Uchaly Urban Settlement.

== Economy ==
The largest industry in the town is an ore-dressing and processing factory (Uchaly Mining and Metallurgical Combine, Ural Mining and Metallurgical Company) which is an important producer of zinc concentrate in Russia.

== Demographics ==
Population: 37,788 (2010 census); 37,196 (2002 census); 32,404 (1989 Soviet census).

According to the 2010 Census, the ethnic composition of the town's population was as follows:

1. Bashkirs: 50.2%
2. Russians: 26.6%
3. Tatars: 20.9%
4. other ethnicities: 2.3%

== Education ==
There are six schools in Uchaly. Higher education facilities in Uchaly include the Uchaly branch of the Bashkir State University, the Mining and Metallurgical College, and the College of Arts and Culture.

== Gallery ==
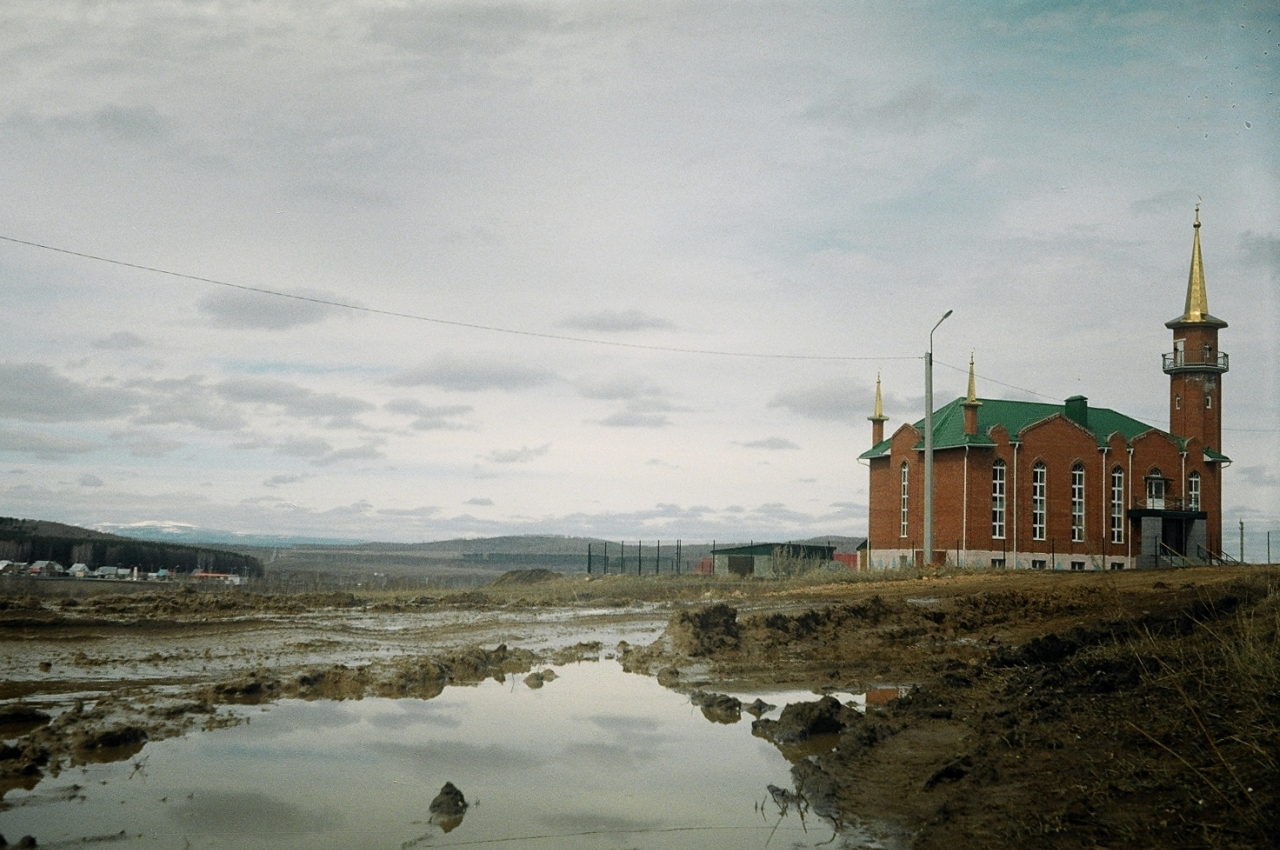
Zaynulla Rasulev Mosque.

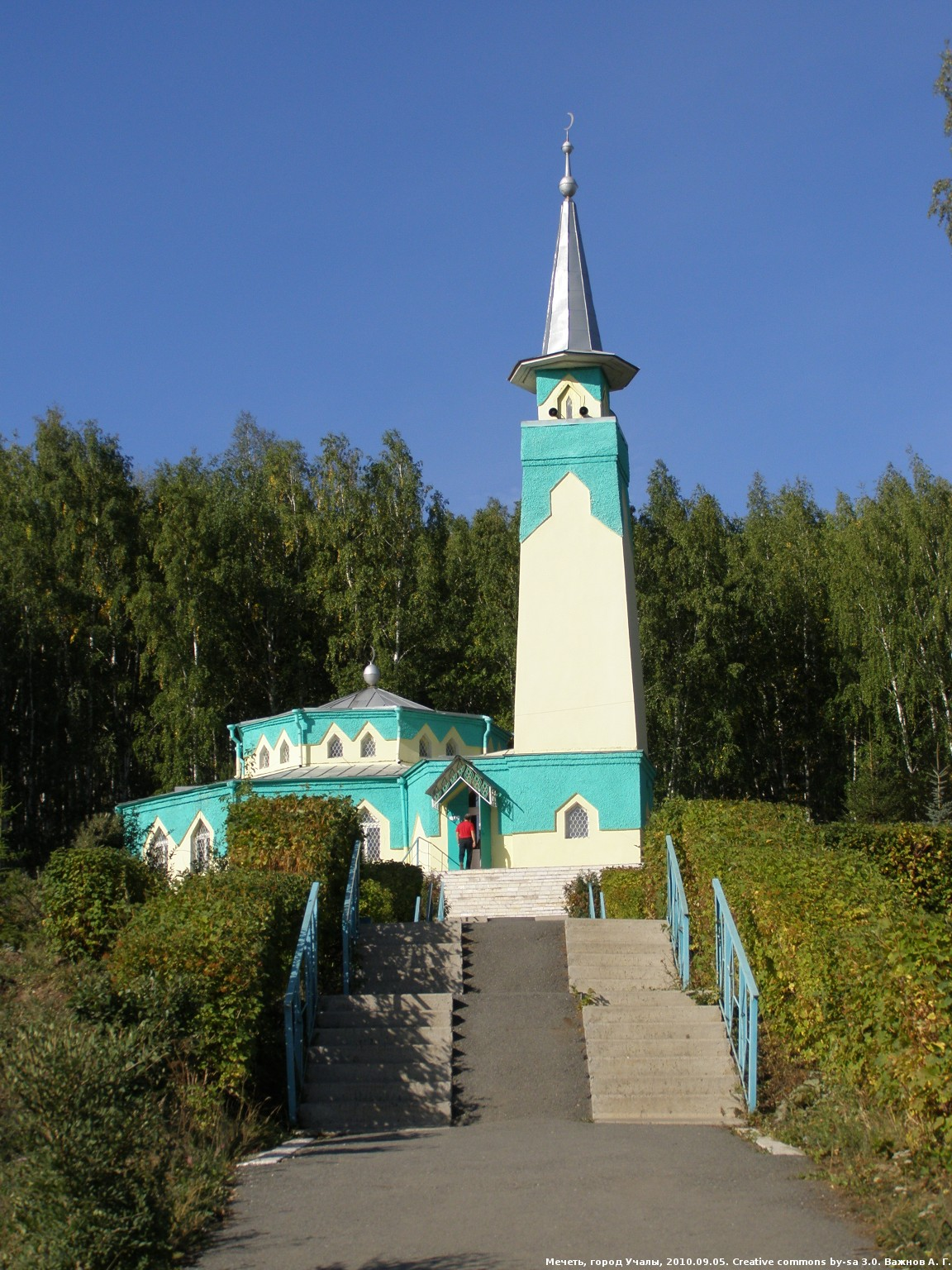
Uchaly First Mosque.

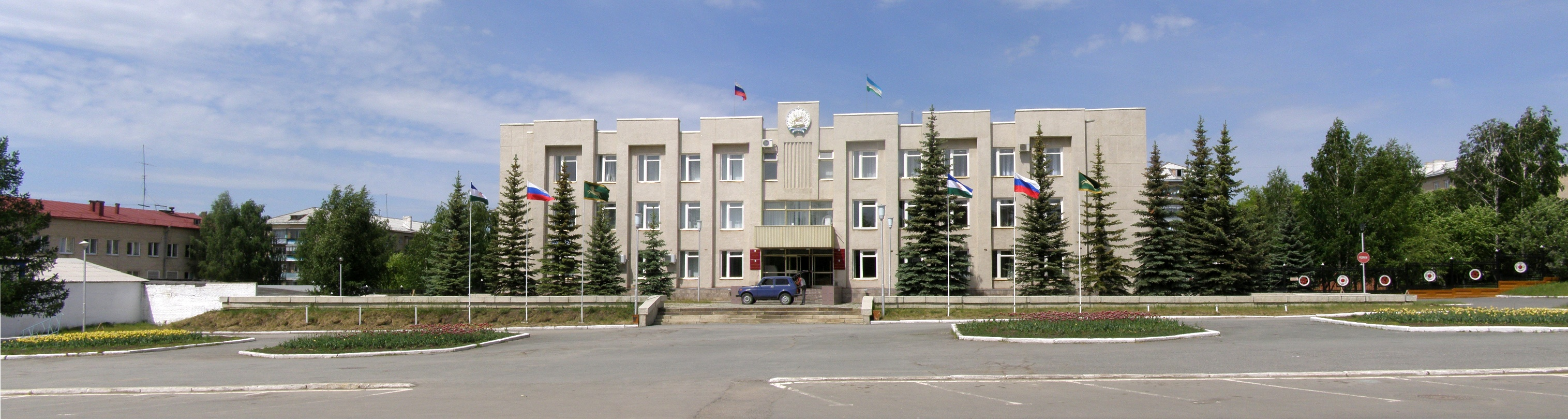
Uchaly municipality headquarters

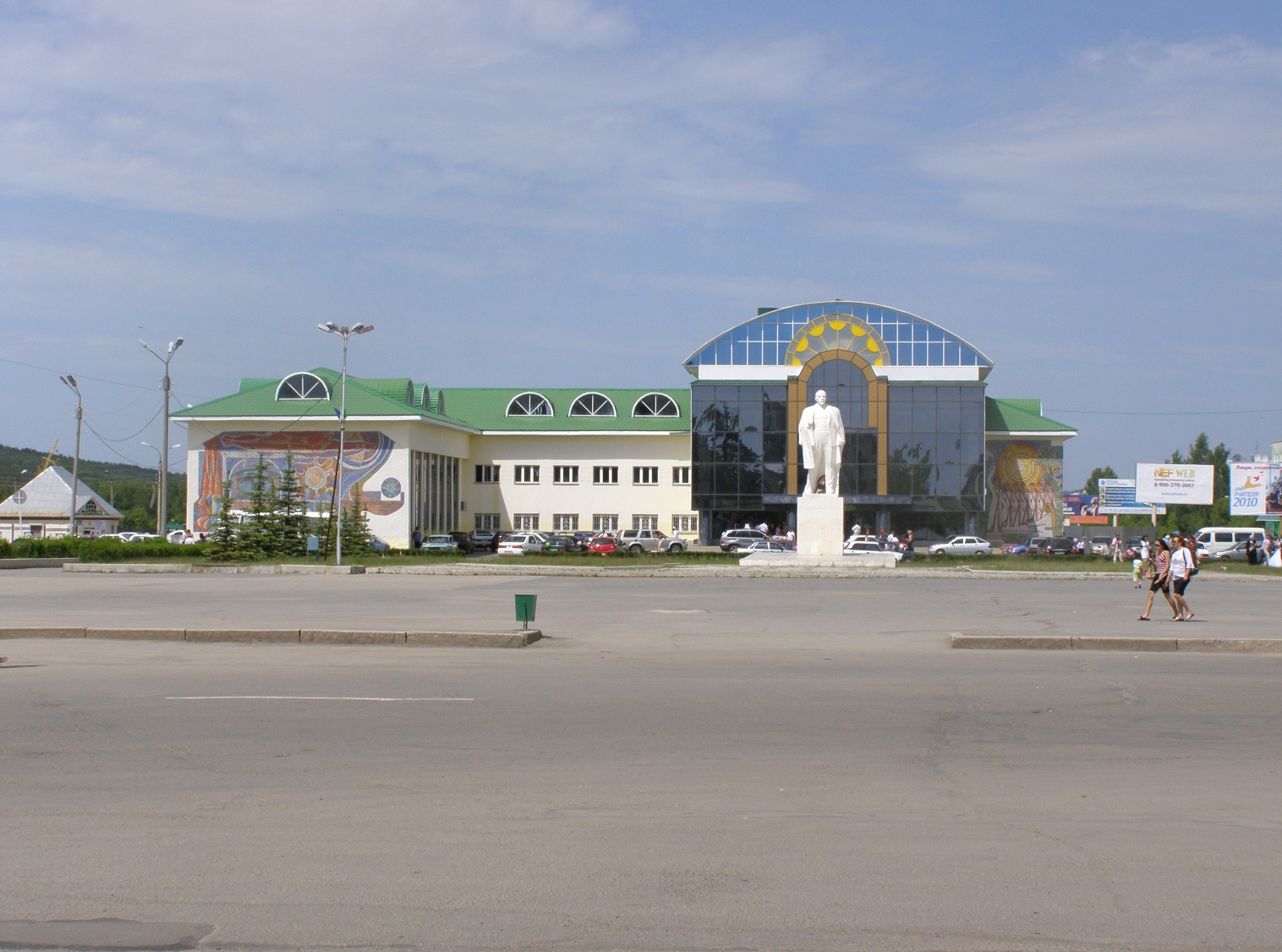
Lenin square

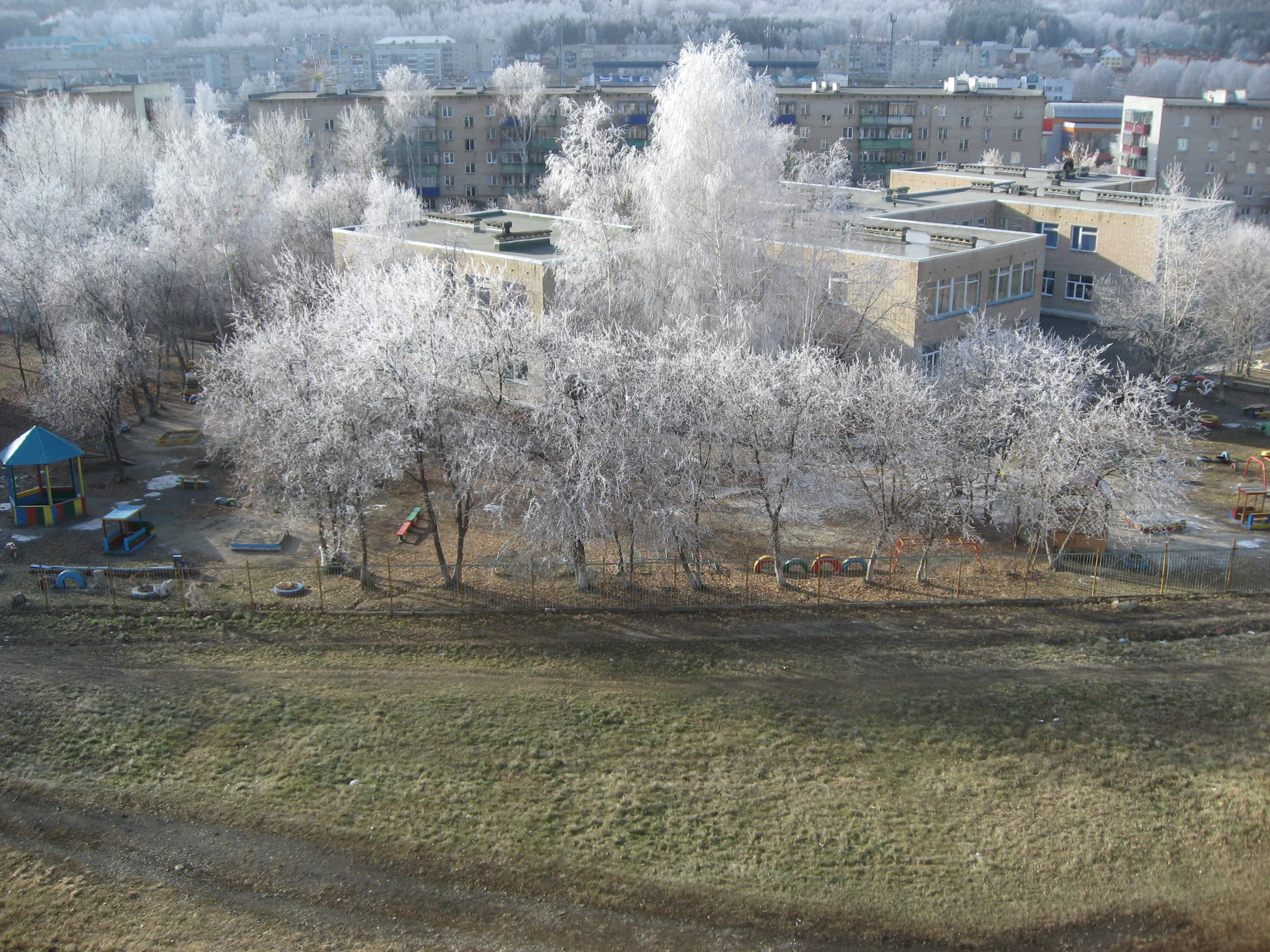
The Kindergarten "Daisy", Uchaly. November 6, 2014.

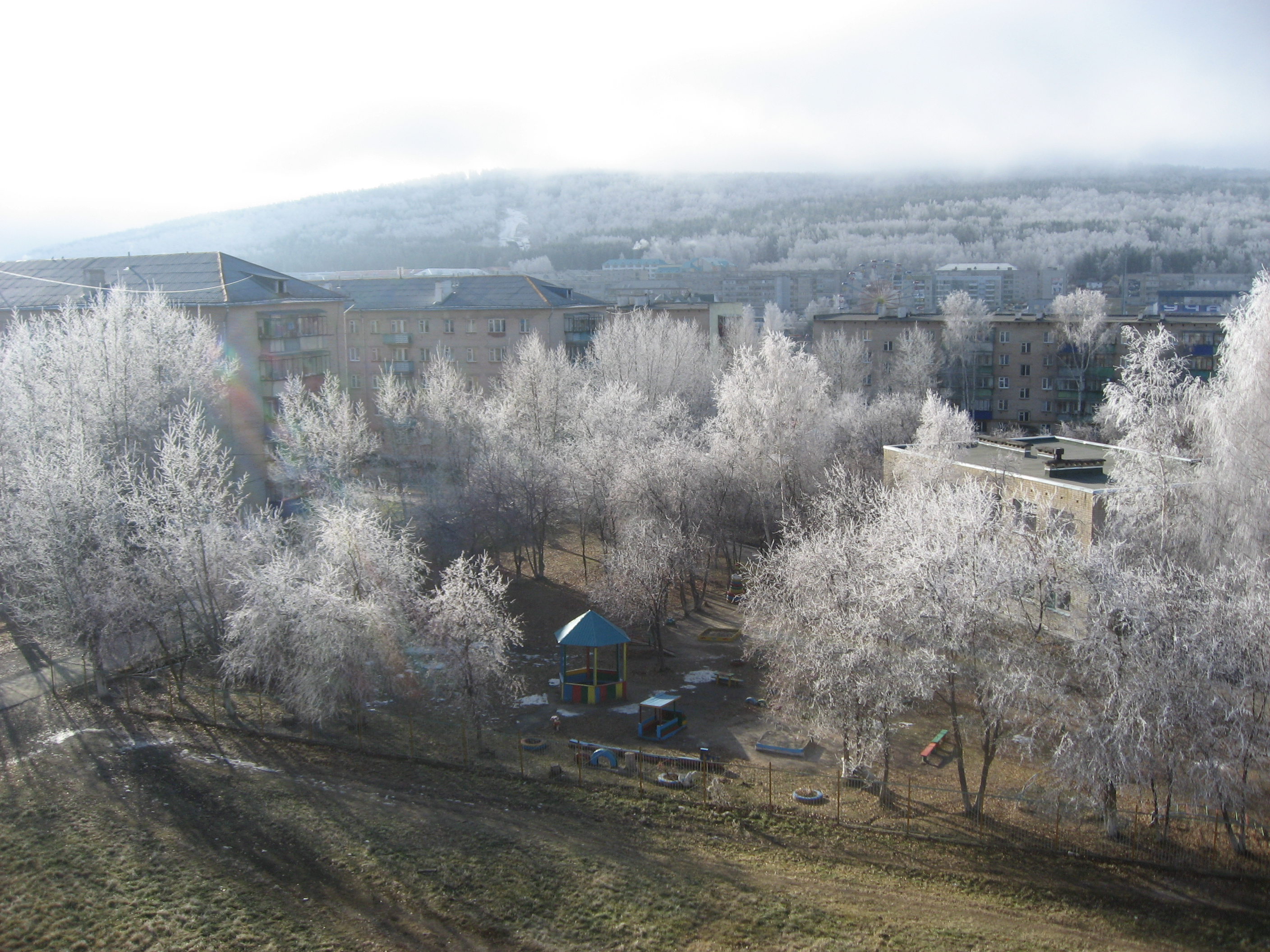
The Kindergarten "Daisy", Uchaly. November 6, 2014.

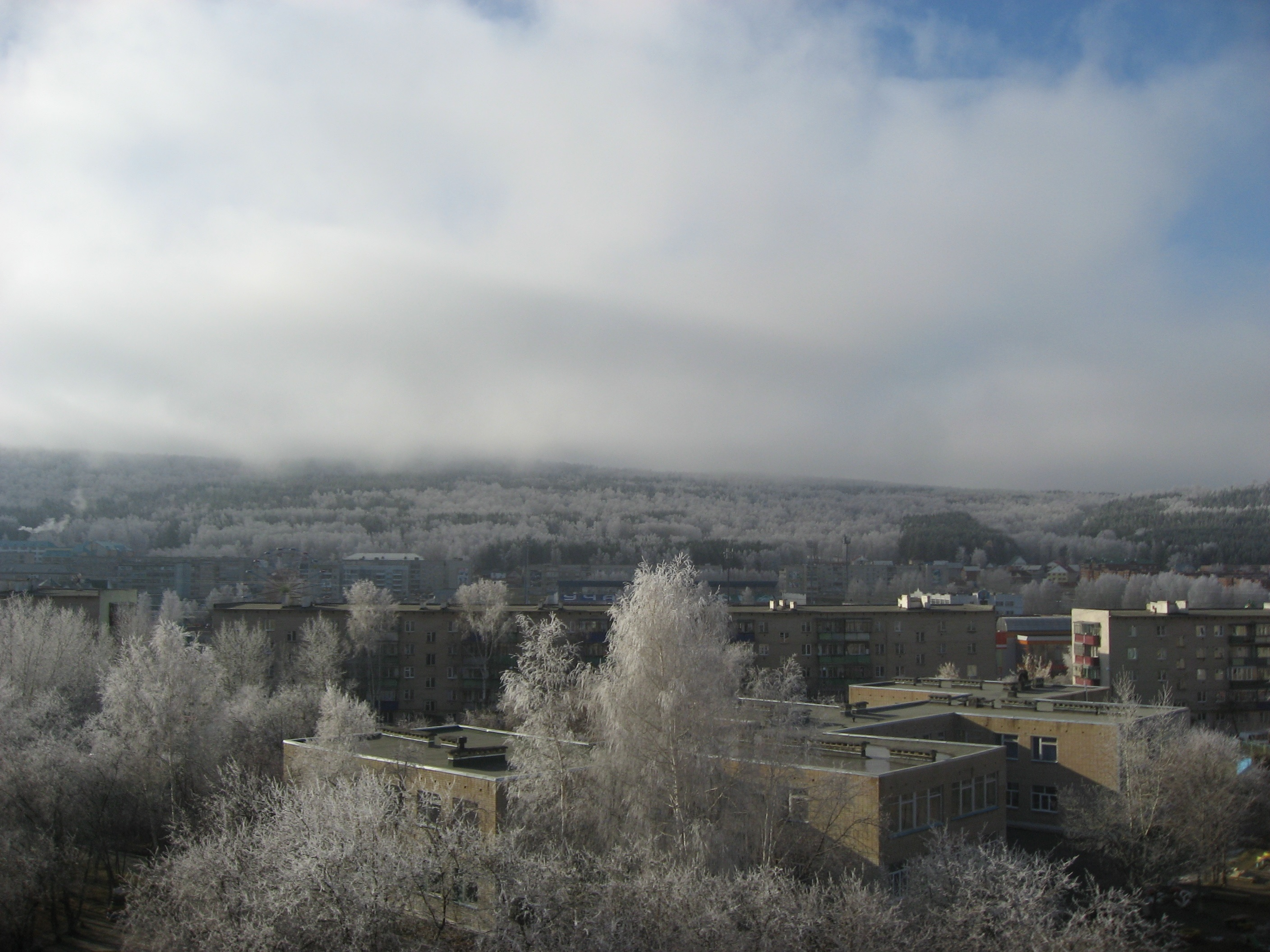
View to the mountain Tashbiek, Uchaly. November 6, 2014.

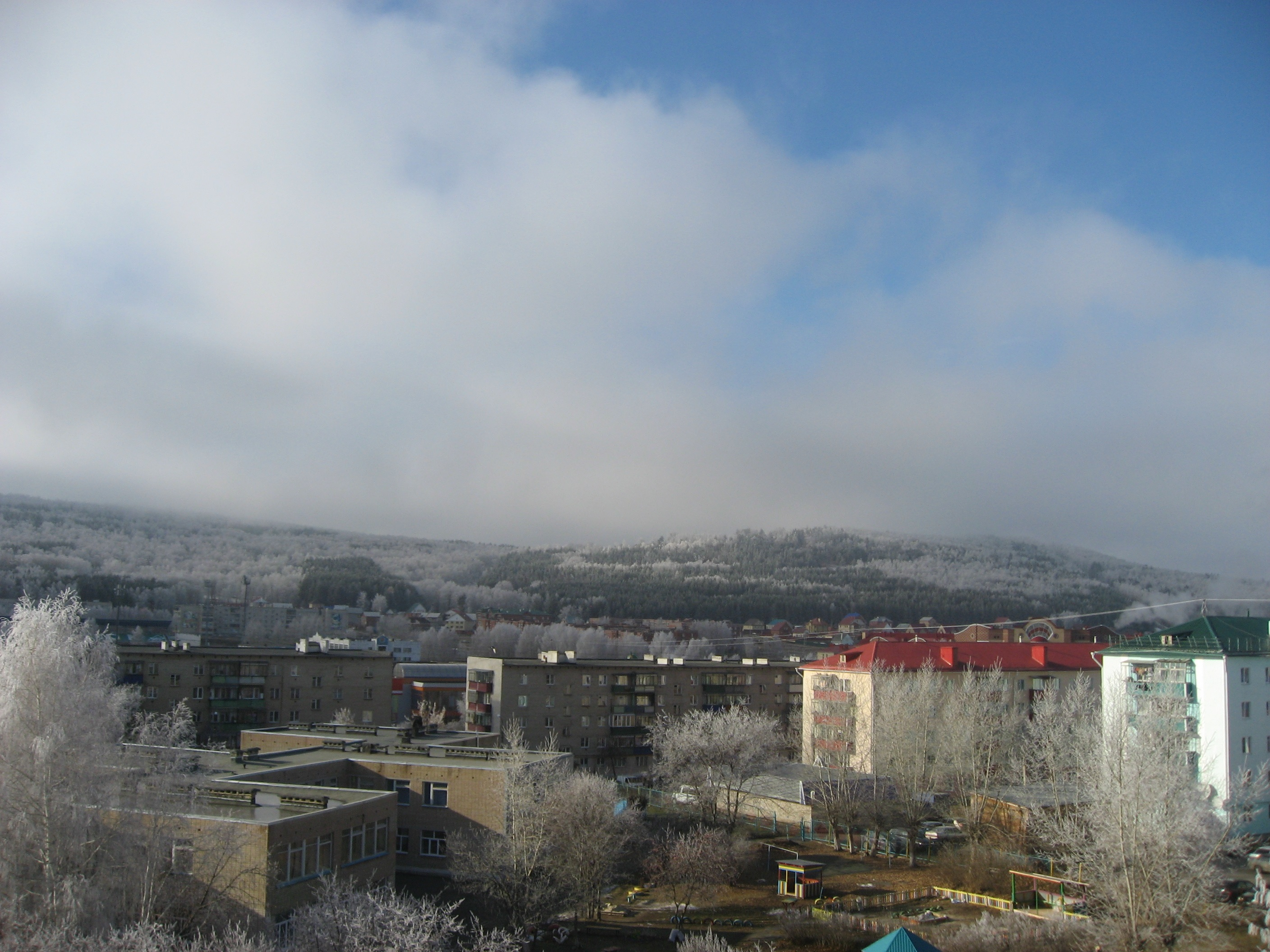
View to the mountain Tashbiek, Uchaly. November 6, 2014.
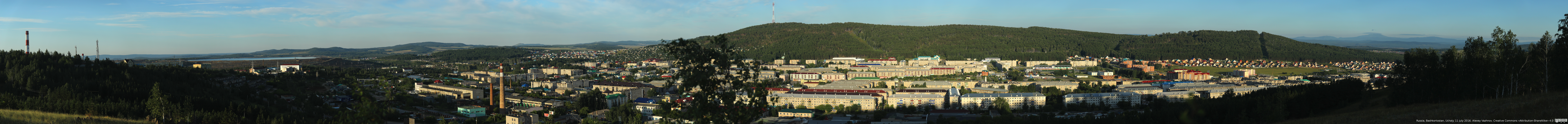
Panorama of Uchaly on Kokbash mountain
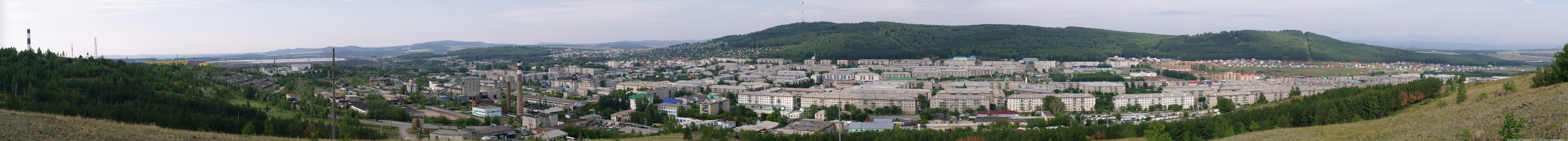
Panorama of Uchaly
