= Uchalinsky District =

Uchalinsky District Учалинский район (Russian)
- District

Other transcription(s)
  - Bashkir: Учалы районы
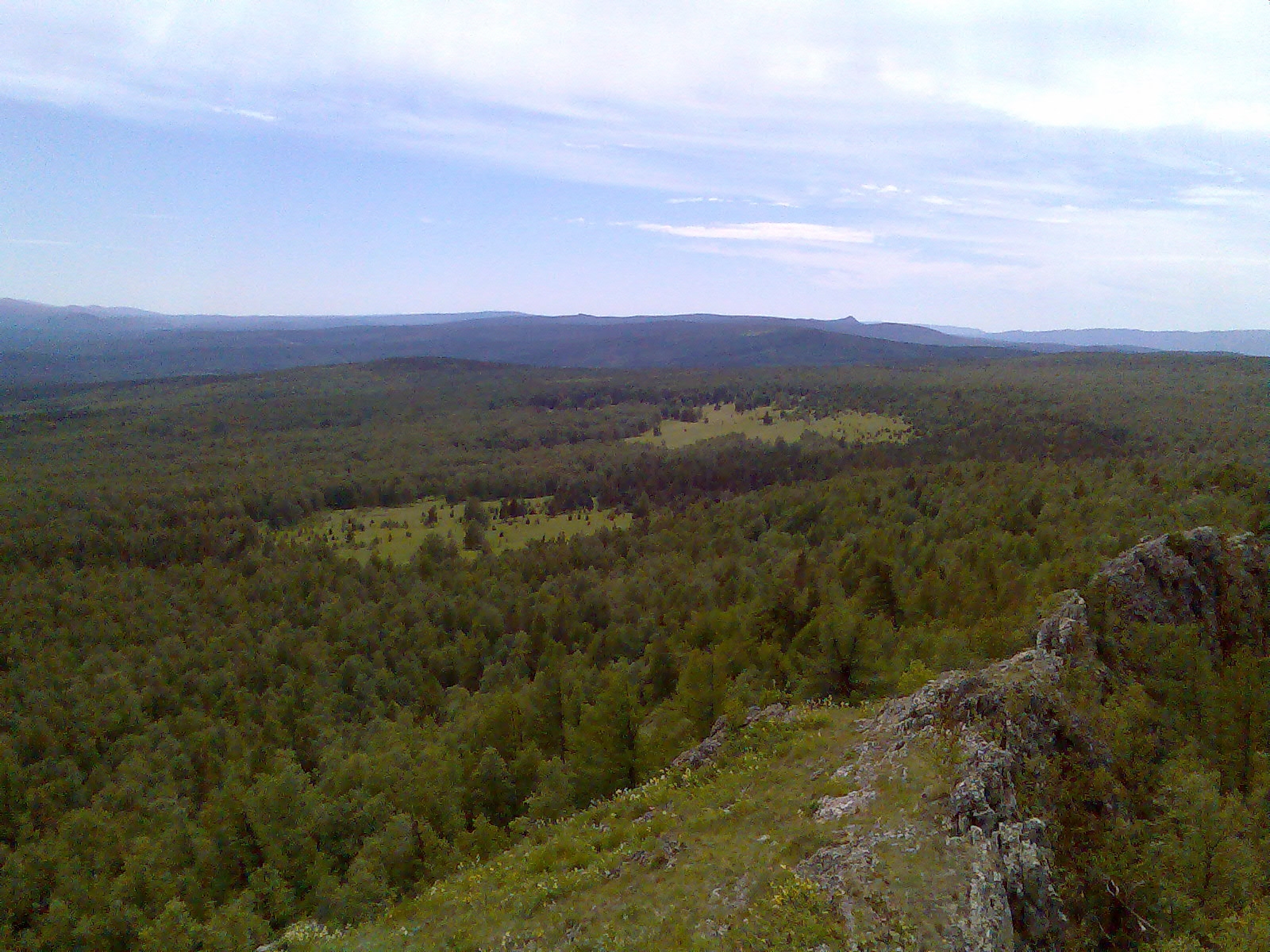
- South view from Mount Kurtashtau in Uchalinsky District

- Flag Coat of arms
- Location of Uchalinsky District in the Republic of Bashkortostan
- Coordinates: 54°19′N 59°23′E
- Country: Russia
- Federal subject: Republic of Bashkortostan
- Established: 1930
- Administrative center: Uchaly

Area
  - Total: 4,510 km^{2} (1,740 sq mi)

Population (2010 Census)
  - Total: 35,480
  - Estimate (2018): 70,968 (+100%)
  - Density: 7.87/km^{2} (20.4/sq mi)
  - Urban: 0%
  - Rural: 100%

Administrative structure
  - Administrative divisions: 18 Selsoviets
  - Inhabited localities: 87 rural localities

Municipal structure
  - Municipally incorporated as: Uchalinsky Municipal District
  - Municipal divisions: 1 urban settlements, 18 rural settlements
- Time zone: UTC+5 (MSK+2)
- OKTMO ID: 80653000
- Website: https://uchaly.bashkortostan.ru/

Uchalinsky District (Russian: Учали́нский райо́н; Bashkir: Учалы районы, Uçalı rayonı) is an administrative and municipal district (raion), one of the fifty-four in the Republic of Bashkortostan, Russia. It is located in the east of the republic and borders with Chelyabinsk Oblast in the north, east, and south, Abzelilovsky District in the south, and with Beloretsky District in the west. The area of the district is 4,510 square kilometers (1,740 sq mi). Its administrative center is the town of Uchaly (which is not administratively a part of the district). As of the 2010 Census, the total population of the district was 35,480.

== History ==
In 1824 the tsar Alexander I visited the deposit Tashkutargan which was later named the «Tsarevo-Alexander gold-field» in his honour. They say that following his accompanies’ advice he went down to the mine, got 22 poods of sand and «discovered» a nugget weighing more than three kilograms and took it as a souvenir. The Tsarevo-Alexander gold-field gave 6,400 kg of gold within 18 years. Nikifor Sutkin, a serf, found the largest nugget of gold weighing 36 kg. It was sent to St. Petersburg. Now it is known as the «Large Triangle» and kept in the Diamond Fund of the former Soviet Union.

The district was established in 1930.

== Administrative and municipal status ==
Within the framework of administrative divisions, Uchalinsky District is one of the fifty-four in the Republic of Bashkortostan. It is divided into eighteen selsoviets, comprising eighty-seven rural localities. The town of Uchaly serves as its administrative center, despite being incorporated separately as a town of republic significance—an administrative unit with the status equal to that of the districts.

As a municipal division, the district is incorporated as Uchalinsky Municipal District, with the town of republic significance of Uchaly being incorporated within it as Uchaly Urban Settlement. Its eighteen selsoviets are incorporated as eighteen rural settlements within the municipal district. The town of Uchaly serves as the administrative center of the municipal district as well.

== Demographics ==
Population of Uchalinsky District
- 2010 Census: 35,480
- 2002 Census: 35,649
- 1989 Census: 32,147
- 1979 Census: 37,182

In terms of ethnic composition, as of the 2010 Census 64.3% of the population were Bashkirs, 15.9% were Tatars, and 18.2% were Russians, with 1.6% accounting for other ethnicities.
