= List of company towns =

This is a list of company towns.

See the category Company towns for an unannotated list of articles.
See the category Socialist planned cities for an unannotated list of articles.

== Europe ==
=== Belgium ===
- Louvain-la-Neuve, home of the Université Catholique de Louvain
- Grand-Hornu, one of the four industrial sites in Wallonia that were listed by UNESCO as a World Heritage Site in 2012.

=== Czech Republic ===
- Zlín, original headquarters of Bata Shoes company
- Zruč nad Sázavou, Central Bohemia region (Bata came in 1939)
- Sezimovo Ústí

=== Denmark ===
- Billund, home of LEGO's International Headquarters
- Bjerringbro, home of Grundfos' International headquarters.
- Nordborg, home of Danfoss' International headquarters.
- Struer, home of Bang & Olufsen' International headquarters.

=== France ===
- Cité ouvrière at Mulhouse
- Noisiel (Seine-et-Marne), home of the chocolate factory owned by the Menier Family
- Sochaux-Montbéliard (Doubs), home of Peugeot
- Villeneuvette (Hérault), mill town owned by Jules Maistre
- Le Creusot (Saône-et-Loire), forge town developed by Eugène and Adolphe Schneider.
- Hayange and Jœuf, blast furnaces towns, fiefdoms of De Wendel family.
- Thumeries (Nord), home of the sugar factory previously owned by the Béghin Family

=== Germany ===
- Leverkusen, home of the Bayer AG
- Wolfsburg, built to house Volkswagen workers
- Sindelfingen, home of Mercedes-Benz's largest production plant, the Mercedes-Benz Museum, Mercedes-Benz Advanced Design Studio, and its Customer Center. Sindelfingen is a suburb of Stuttgart, headquarters of Mercedes-Benz.
- Salzgitter, built around the Reichswerke Hermann Göring that later became the Salzgitter AG.

==== Former GDR ====
- Eisenhüttenstadt
- Schwedt
- Halle-Neustadt
- Wolfen-Nord, now in Bitterfeld-Wolfen
- Hoyerswerda

=== Hungary ===
- Dunaújváros
- Tiszaújváros
- Petőfibánya

=== Ireland ===
- Rochfortbridge (County Westmeath), built by public company OPW in the 1840s as part of famine relief on the site of an original village and rebuilt 110 years later by Bord na Móna during the 1950s for its employees, the more modern phase being designed by architect Frank Gibney.

=== Italy ===
- Colleferro, Lazio. Built in the 1912 by Bombrini-Parodi-Delfino for company's workers of the factory located in the neighbourhood of the city.
- Corte di Cadore, Borca di Cadore, Veneto
- Metanopoli, San Donato Milanese, Lombardy. Built by Enrico Mattei for Eni's workers.
- Rosignano Solvay, Rosignano Marittimo, Tuscany. Built by Solvay for company's workers.
- Villaggio ANIC, Ravenna, Emilia-Romagna

=== Moldova ===
- Dnestrovsc, developed by Moldavskaya GRES

=== Netherlands ===
- Batadorp, Best municipality, developed by Bata Shoes
- Heveadorp, Renkum municipality, developed by rubber manufacturing company Hevea
- Philipsdorp, Eindhoven municipality, developed by Philips. Philips employed about 40.000 people in Eindhoven in the mid sixties.
- Radio Kootwijk, Apeldoorn municipality, developed by Dutch P.T.T.

=== Norway ===
- Barentsburg, mining town run by Arktikugol
- Grumant, ghost mining town run by Arktikugol
- Longyearbyen, former mining company town run by Store Norske Spitsbergen Kulkompani
- Ny-Ålesund, former mining, now research town run by Kings Bay
- Pyramiden, ghost mining town run by Arktikugol
- Sveagruva, mining town run by Store Norske
- Rjukan, former Norsk Hydro company town

=== Poland ===
- Nowa Huta in Kraków
- Giszowiec and Nikiszowiec in Katowice
- Stalowa Wola and Nowa Dęba in the Central Industrial Region (Poland)
- Kawęczyn (historically, until 1944), now part of Warsaw

=== Ukraine ===
- Sievierodonetsk
- Pripyat

=== Russia ===
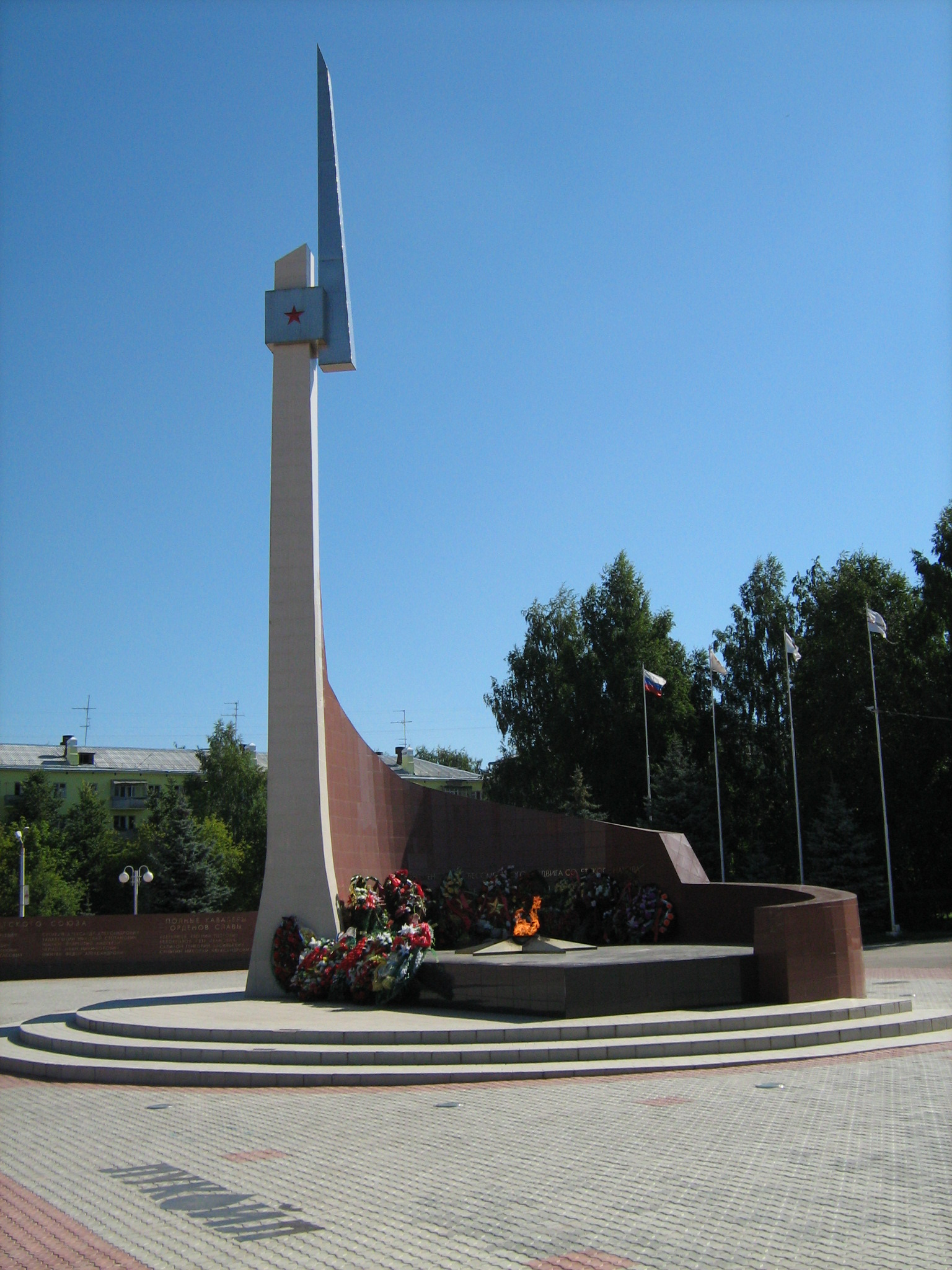
Kstovo's Peace Square and the WWII monument, sponsored by its city's company LUKOIL.

Iron and steel industry:

- Magnitogorsk

Non-ferrous metal industry (the plants there are mostly owned by Norilsk Nickel):

- Norilsk
- Monchegorsk
- Zapolyarny
- Nikel

Iron mining:

- Kovdor
- Olenegorsk

Non-metal mineral extraction and processing:

- Apatity
- Kirovsk

Oil and gas:

- Surgut
- Nizhnevartovsk
- Nefteyugansk
- Novy Urengoy

Petrochemical industry:

- Kstovo
- Kirishi

Textile industry

- Ivanovo – the "city of brides"

Russian writers and politicians commonly use the expression "градообразующее предприятие" (gradoobrazuyushcheye predpriyatiye, literally 'the enterprise that has created the town') to refer to the industrial facility—these days often part of a larger company such as LUKOIL or Norilsk Nickel—that is the city's main employer and the main source of funding for the city's budget.

=== Slovakia ===
- Partizánske (formerly Baťovany), founded by Jan Antonín Baťa of the Bata Shoes company (partly out of an existing local municipality and its cadastre)
- Svit, founded by Jan Antonín Baťa of the Bata Shoes company

=== Sweden ===
- Kiruna

== North America ==
=== Canada ===
See List of company towns in Canada

=== Dominican Republic ===
- La Romana, primarily owned by the Central Romana Corporation (part of the Fanjul sugar and real estate empire).

=== Mexico ===
- Ciudad Pemex, Tabasco built around a PEMEX plant.
- Cananea
- El Boleo
- Nacozari
- Navojoa
- Copala
- Concordia
- Santa Eulalia
- Santa Rosalía de Camargo
- Batopilas
- Esperanzas.

=== United States ===
See List of company towns in the United States

== South America ==
=== Brazil ===
- Fordlândia, established by American industrialist Henry Ford in 1928 and abandoned in 1934.

=== Chile ===
- Humberstone was a settlement dedicated to the extraction of saltpeter during said commodity's boom in the late 19th and early 20th centuries. The town was founded and administered by James Thomas Humberstone's Peru Nitrate Company, later acquired by Compañía Salitrera de Tarapacá y Antofagasta (COSATAN), before turning into a ghost town by the 1960s due to the steady decline in the global price of nitrates caused by the development of chemically engineered fertilizers.
- Sewell, founded in 1906 by the Braden Copper Company.

== Asia ==
=== India ===
- Kumarapatnam, Karnataka, developed by Grasim Industries, Aditya Birla Group. A small town developed solely due to two large scale units of Grasim Industries (textiles).
- Vikroli, Mumbai, earlier Bombay, developed by Godrej & Boyce Manufacturing Co. Ltd. Sakharwadi, Maharashtra, developed by Walchand Industries Kirloskarwadi, Maharashtra developed by L.K.Kirloskar
- Nagda, Madhya Pradesh, developed by Grasim Industries, Aditya Birla Group. The town economy is mostly dependent on the 4 large scale units of Grasim Industries (textiles).
- Kansbahal, Orissa, developed by Larsen & Toubro Ltd. with the residential colonies, schools, hospital etc. all being established and maintained by L&T's heavy engineering works.
- Jamshedpur, Jharkhand, developed by Tata Group.
- Kailasapuram, Tiruchirapalli, Tamil Nadu developed by Bharat Heavy Electricals Limited. with the residential colonies, schools, hospital, Stadium, open air theaters etc. all being established and maintained by Bharat Heavy Electricals Limited.

=== Indonesia ===
- Tembagapura, Papua developed by PT Freeport Indonesia (subsidiary of Freeport-McMoRan)

=== Japan ===
Hokkaido

- Muroran, Hokkaido – Nippon Steel & Sumitomo Metal Corporation Muroran
- Tomakomai, Hokkaido – Oji Paper Company Tomakomai
- Asahikawa, Hokkaido – Nippon Paper Industries Co., Ltd. Asahikawa

Tohoku district

- Nikaho, Akita – TDK
- Aizuwakamatsu, Fukushima – Fujitsu Tohoku

Kanto district

- Hitachi, Ibaraki and Hitachinaka, Ibaraki – Hitachi
- Kashima, Ibaraki – Nippon Steel & Sumitomo Metal
- Yaita, Tochigi – Sharp Corporation
- Ota, Gunma – Fuji Heavy Industries Gunma
- Oizumi, Gunma – SanyoTokyo
- Noda, Chiba – Kikkoman
- Urayasu, Chiba – The Oriental Land Company, Tokyo Disney Resort
- Kimitsu, Chiba – Nippon Steel & Sumitomo Metal Kimitsu
- Kita, Tokyo – Oji Paper Company A foundation place and a research institute exist.
- Fuchu, Tokyo – Toshiba Fuchu
- Minamiashigara, Kanagawa and Kaisei, Kanagawa – Fujifilm
- Hino, Tokyo – Hino Motors

Chubu district

- Kurobe, Toyama – YKK
- Komatsu, Ishikawa – Komatsu Limited
- Suwa, Nagano – Epson
- Iwata, Shizuoka – Yamaha
- Toyota City, Japan – Toyota
- Kariya, Aichi – Toyota Industries, Denso, Aisin Seiki Co., Toyota Auto Body, Co. Ltd., and Toyota Boshoku
- Tahara, Aichi – Toyota Tahara
- Tokoname, Aichi – INAX
- Suzuka, Mie – Honda

Kinki district

- Ikeda, Osaka – Daihatsu
- Moriguchi, Osaka and Daitō, Osaka – Sanyo
- Kadoma, Osaka – Panasonic
- Aioi, Hyōgo – IHI, Harima
- Ayabe, Kyoto – Gunze Limited

Chugoku district

- Hiezu, Tottori – Oji Paper Company Yonago
- Tamano, Okayama – Mitsui E&S
- Fukuyama, Hiroshima – JFE Steel Corporation
- Fuchu, Hiroshima、Bofu, Yamaguchi – Mazda
- Ube, Yamaguchi – Ube Industries
- Iwakuni, Yamaguchi – Mitsui Chemicals
- Sanyo-Onoda, Yamaguchi – Taiheiyo Cement

Shikoku district

- Naruto, Tokushima – Otsuka Pharmaceutical
- Anan, Tokushima – Nichia
- Shikokuchūō, Ehime – Daio Paper Corporation – Ehime Paper Mfg. Co..
- Niihama, Ehime – Sumitomo Metal Mining Co., Ltd.

Kyushu district

- KitaKyushu, Fukuoka (Yahatahigashi-ku, Kitakyūshū) – Nippon Steel & Sumitomo Metal Corporation and Toto
- Omuta, Fukuoka – Mitsui
- Kurume, Fukuoka – Bridgestone
- Kanda, Fukuoka – Nissan Motor Company・Nissan Shatai Kyushu、Toyota Kyushu
- Tosu, Saga – Hisamitsu Pharmaceutical
- Nagasaki, Nagasaki – Mitsubishi Heavy Industries、Mitsubishi Electric
- Sasebo, Nagasaki – Sasebo Heavy Industries Co., Ltd.
- Yatsushiro, Kumamoto – Nippon Paper Industries Co., Ltd. Yashiro
- Minamata, Kumamoto – Chisso
- Nagasu, Kumamoto – Japan Marine United Corporation
- Nakatsu, Oita – Daihatsu Kyushu
- Nobeoka, Miyazaki – Asahi Kasei
- Nichinan, Miyazaki – Oji Paper Company Nichinan

=== Malaysia ===
- Proton City, Tanjung Malim, Perak developed by Proton Holding Berhad

=== Pakistan ===
- Batapur, a residence area for labour workers in the Bata shoe factory.
- Steel Town, a residential area for employees of Pakistan Steel Mills.

=== Vietnam ===
- VinCity by Vincom Group.

== Australia ==
- Cabramurra, New South Wales, built as part of the Snowy Mountains Scheme
- Jabiru, Northern Territory, built for the Ranger Uranium Mine
- Leinster, Western Australia, BHP mining town, closed community
- Moomba, South Australia, built for gas processing
- Mount Beauty, Victoria and Bogong Village, established by the State Electricity Commission of Victoria to house construction workers from the Kiewa Hydroelectric Scheme
- Nhulunbuy, Northern Territory, built for workers at the Alcan Gove Alumina Refinery and mining operation, operated by Rio Tinto
- Roxby Downs, South Australia, built for Olympic Dam mine
- Useless Loop, Western Australia, Shark Bay Resources, Solar Salt Operations
- Yallourn, Victoria, now demolished, built by the State Electricity Commission of Victoria for workers at the Yallourn Power Station

== West Asia ==
- Ahmadi, home of Kuwait Oil Company
- Awali, home of the Bahrain Petroleum Company

=== Iran ===
- Naft Shahr, a city established for oil well drilling.
- Mahshahr, a petroleum exporting port.
- Salafchegan, an industrial city
- Alborz Industrial City
