= SVIT =

Svit or SVIT may refer to:

- Svit, Poprad District, Slovakia
- Brina Svit (born 1954), Slovenian writer
- Bucciero SVIT, a single engine, mid-wing, training and touring aircraft
- FK Svit, a Slovak football club
- Sai Vidya Institute of Technology, Bangalore, Karnataka, India
