= Marek Mach =

Marek Mach may refer to:

- Marek Mach (activist), Slovak activist
- Marek Mach (footballer), Czech footballer
