= Edoardo Gellner =

Italian architect and urban planner

- Born: Eduard Walter Gellner; 20 January 1909; Opatija, Austria-Hungary
- Died: 10 December 2004 (aged 95); Cortina d'Ampezzo, Veneto, Italy
- Education: Iuav University of Venice
- Occupations: Architect, urban planner

Edoardo Gellner (20 January 1909 – 10 December 2004) was an Italian architect and urban planner whose work was associated with the Italian Alps and the Dolomites. He is best known for designing the Eni village of Corte di Cadore, one of the most significant examples of post-war company towns in Italy.

== Life and career ==
Born in Opatija (then in Austria-Hungary, now Croatia), Gellner trained in his father's construction firm before studying architecture at the Iuav University of Venice, graduating in 1946 under Giuseppe Samonà. He established his practice in Cortina d'Ampezzo, where he remained for the rest of his career, producing works that ranged from private houses and hotels to urban plans and landscape projects.

Among his best-known works are the master plan and buildings for the Eni village of Corte di Cadore at Borca di Cadore (1953–1965), with the church in collaboration with Carlo Scarpa, the master plan for Cortina d'Ampezzo (1949–1955), the Residence Palace Hotel, the Cortina Post Office, and numerous public buildings and tourist facilities in the Dolomites. He also worked on projects in Sicily, the Elba island, the Netherlands and Tunisia.

Alongside his architectural practice, Gellner was active in research on Alpine vernacular architecture, publishing studies on the traditional buildings of the Dolomites. He received the IN/ARCH Award in 1963 for the ENI Village project.

== Sources ==
- Fois, Valeria; Merlo, Michele (2004). Edoardo Gellner. Percepire il paesaggio – Living Landscape. Milan: Skira.
- Mancuso, Franco (1996). Edoardo Gellner. Il mestiere dell'architetto. Milan: Electa.
- Severati, Carlo; Merlo, Michele (2006). Edoardo Gellner: architetture organiche per Enrico Mattei, 1954-1961: atti della giornata di studi, Roma, Gela, Pieve di Cadore, Sala Herzog, Facoltà di architettura, Roma Tre, 17 marzo 2005. Rome: Gangemi Editore.
