= Ondrej Vrábel =

Ondrej Vrábel may refer to:

- Ondrej Vrábel (philanthropist), Slovak philanthropist, programmer, co-founder of civic association Mladí and entrepreneur
- Ondrej Vrábel (footballer), Slovak footballer who plays for Nitra as a midfielder
