= Crystal Wing Awards =

Annual Slovak award

Crystal Wing Awards Krištáľové krídlo
- Country: Slovakia
- Presented by: Krištáľové krídlo s. r. o.
- First award: 1997
- Website: kristalovekridlo.sk

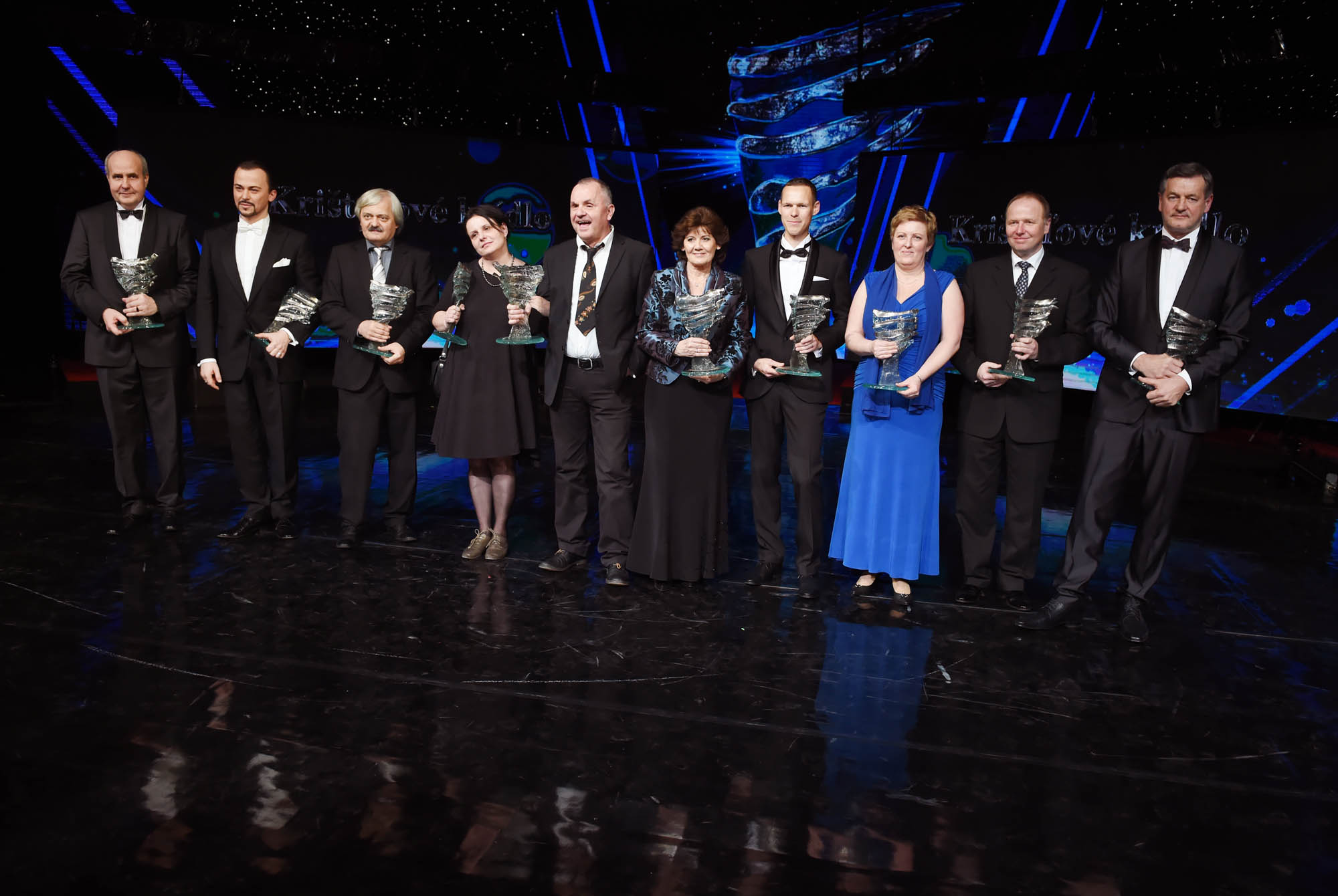
Laureates of the Crystal Wing award, 2015

The Crystal Wing Awards (Slovak: Krištáľové krídlo) in Slovakia are annual awards that recognise personal accomplishments in the areas of social, cultural, economic and public life. The 20th edition of the awards, conceived by Mária Vaškovičová, was held in January 2017.

== Categories and awards ==
=== Philanthropy ===
- 2015 – Miroslava Hunčíková
- 2016 – Ondrej Vrábel
- 2017 – Marek Machata
- 2019 – Eva Klikáčová
- 2021 – Eva Gažová

=== Sport ===
- 2015 – Matej Tóth
- 2016 – Ladislav Škantár and Peter Škantár
- 2017 – Peter Hámor
- 2019 – Petra Vlhová
- 2021 – Štefan Svitko
- 2024 – Martin Vaculik

=== Journalism and Literature ===
- 2015 – Veronika Šikulová
- 2016 – Daniel Hevier
- 2017 – Dagmar Mozolová
- 2018 – Etela Farkašová
- 2019 – Rudolf Dobiáš
- 2020 – Marián Andričík

=== Economy ===
- 2015 – Jozef Barcaj
- 2016 – Štefan Máj
- 2017 – Vladimír Bakeš
- 2020 – Branislav Cvik and Ľubomír Vančo

=== Music ===
- 2015 – Štefan Kocán
- 2016 – Dalibor Karvay
- 2017 – Rastislav Štúr
- 2020 – Juraj Griglák

=== Rock pop jazz ===
- 2015 – Szidi Tobias
- 2016 – Igor Timko
- 2017 – Celeste Buckingham
- 2020 – Sima Martausová

=== Medicine and science ===
- 1997 – Eva Siracká
- 1998 – Miroslav Urban
- 1998 – Alica Kapellerová
- 1998 – Milan Zaviačič
- 1999 – Lev Bukovský
- 1999 – Jozef Mašura
- 2000 – Hedviga Zajacová, Pavel Traubner, Jaroslav Siman, and Štefan Luby
- 2001 – Ján Slezák and Ivan Kraus
- 2002 – Daniel Ježová
- 2003 – Ján Danko
- 2004 – Ivan Hulín
- 2005 – Silvia Pastoreková
- 2006 – Martin Mistrík
- 2007 – Karol Pieta
- 2008 – Mária Šustrová
- 2009 – Ján Breza
- 2010 – Mária Frankovičová
- 2011 – František Simančik
- 2012 – Oľga Červeňanová
- 2013 – Marián Janák
- 2015 – Igor Lacík
- 2016 – Michal Mego
- 2017 – Lukáš Plank
- 2018 – Michal Hulman
- 2019 – Róbert Hatala
- 2020 – Boris Klempa, Pavol Čekan
- 2021 – Peter Šimko
- 2022 - Richard Imrich
- 2024 – Jurai Payer

=== Visual arts ===
- 2015 – Ivan Pavle
- 2016 – Palo Macho
- 2017 – Juraj Čutek
- 2019 – Ján Ťapák
- 2020 – Oto Bachorík

=== Acting ===
- 2015 – Ladislav Kaboš
- 2016 – Zuzana Mauréry
- 2017 – Tomáš Maštalír
- 2019 – Miroslav Dvorský
- 2020 – Juraj Kukura
- 2021 – Sláva Daubnerová

=== Innovation and Startups ===
- 2019 – Tomáš Brngál
- 2020 – Radoslav Danilak
- 2021 – Martin Herman

=== Special Crystal Wing Award ===
- 2019 – The extraordinary award for lifetime achievement was given to the doctor Kristína Križanová
- 2020 – Jozef Ciller and Ivan Vulev
- 2023 – Marika Gombitová
