= Peter Dvorský =

Slovak operatic tenor (born 1951)

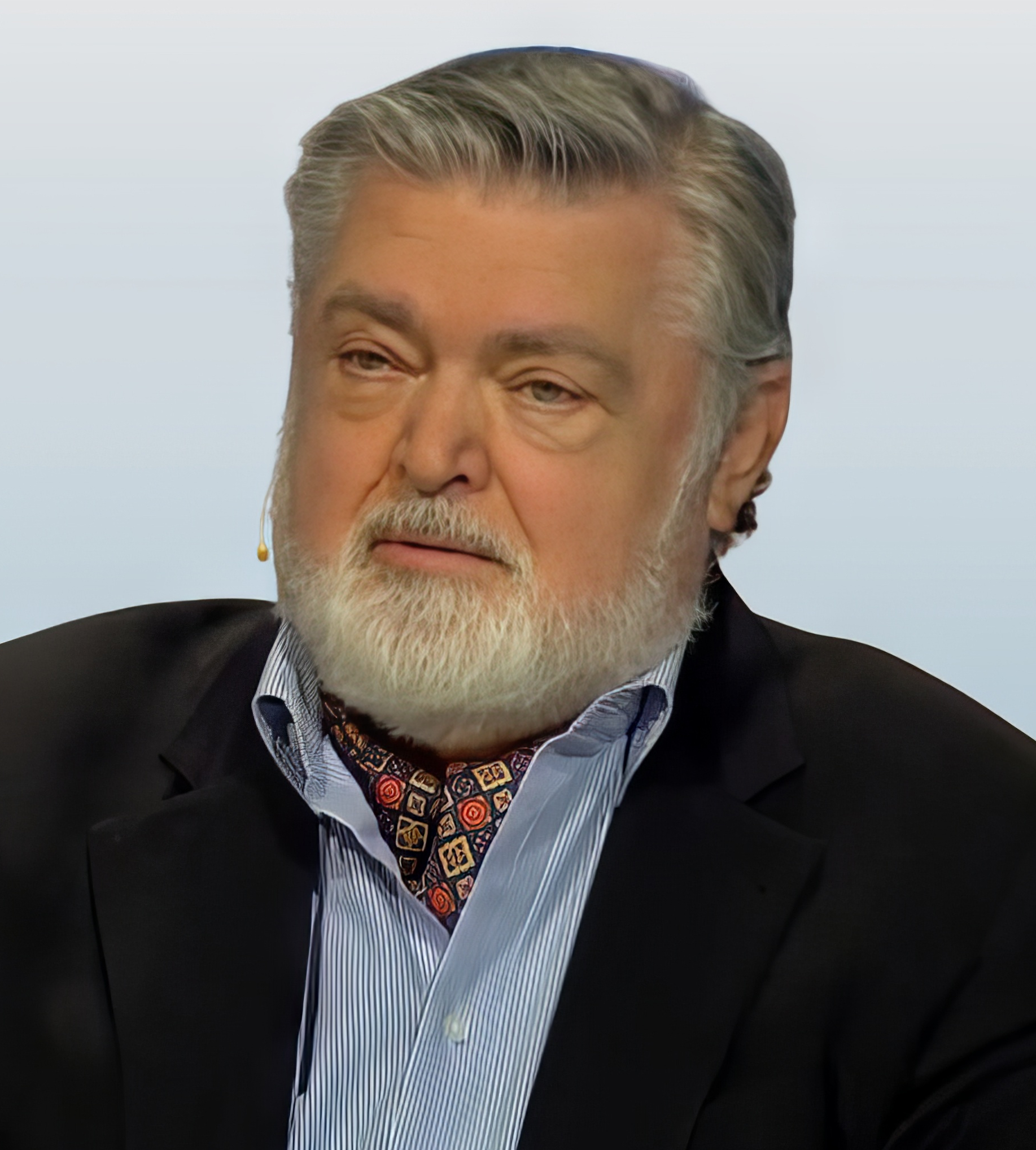
- Dvorský in 2022

Background information
- Born: 25 September 1951 (age 75); Partizánske, Czechoslovakia
- Genre: Opera
- Occupation: Tenor singer
- Instrument: Vocals

Peter Dvorský (born 25 September 1951) is a Slovak operatic tenor. Possessing a lyrical voice with a soft, elastic tone, and warm and melodious timbre, Dvorský's repertoire concentrates on roles from the Italian and Slavic repertories. He has sung the leading lyric tenor roles in the Italian, Slavic, and French repertoire houses all over the world, with occasional forays into spinto roles.

He is regarded as among the greatest Slovak artists, and has been called one of the best tenors in the world. He is considered one of Slovakia's best known cultural figures, both nationally and internationally.

== Early life ==
Dvorský was born in Partizánske in Czechoslovakia (now in Slovakia). He has four brothers, three of whom are also successful opera singers: Jaroslav Dvorský, Miroslav Dvorský and Pavol Dvorský. His other brother, Vendelín Dvorský, is an economist.

Dvorský's musical talent was clear from an early age. He first studied piano, before turning to opera.

== Operatic career ==
Dvorský studied under Ida Černecká at the Bratislava State Conservatory. During the study, he made his professional opera debut at the Slovak National Theatre in 1972, as Lensky in Tchaikovsky's Eugene Onegin.

A year later, he won the national singing contest named after Mikuláš Schneider-Trnavský at Trnava in 1973. In 1974, he won the first prize at the international Tchaikovsky Competition in Moscow. As part of the prize, he was accepted into La Scala's Scuola di Perfezionamento.

In 1975, he won first place in the singing contest at the Geneva International Music Competition. He then entered a yearlong apprenticeship under Renata Carosia and Giuseppe Lugga at La Scala in Milan from 1976 to 1977.

In the following years, he quickly achieved international fame. He debuted at the Vienna State Opera, where he was particularly successful and popular, in 1976, at the New York Metropolitan Opera in 1977, and at La Scala, Milan in 1979. His Covent Garden debut was as the Duke in Verdi's Rigoletto in 1978.

Dvorský was highly esteemed by Luciano Pavarotti, who referred to him several times as "my legitimate successor". In these years he became one of the leading tenors worldwide. He received several distinctions, among others being a national artist and state prize-winner of the former Czechoslovakia.

On October 16, 1996, Dvorský resigned from his 24-year position at the Slovak National Theater (SND), in protest to Slovak Culture Minister Ivan Hudec's firing of director Dušan Jamrich. This event also prompted the resignation of former SND opera director Juraj Hrubant. Of his resignation, Dvorský said: "The reason why I have resigned is because of changes in SND... I left because I don't agree with a culture policy of this kind and also a transformation like this. Unfortunately, I cannot take it anymore."

Since 2006, Dvorský has been the lead tenor of the opera house in Košice.
