= Partizánske =

Town in Slovakia

- Municipality
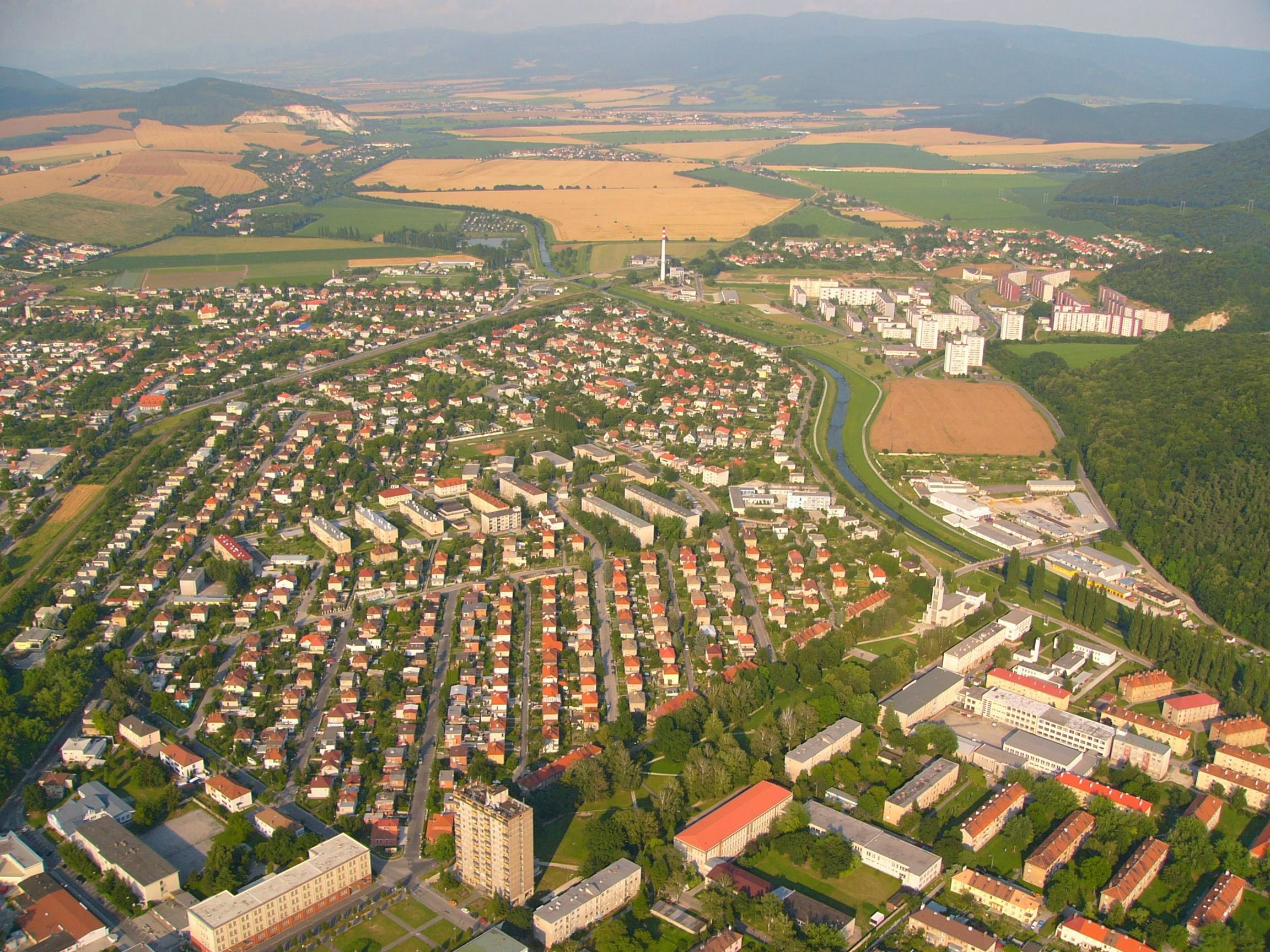

- Flag Coat of arms
- Nickname: Baťovka
- Location of Partizánske in the Trenčín Region Location of Partizánske in Slovakia
- Coordinates: 48.63°N 18.37°E
- Country: Slovakia
- Region: Trenčín Region
- District: Partizánske District
- First mentioned: 1260

Government
  - Mayor: PaedDr. Jozef Božik, PhD.

Area
  - Total: 22.37 km^{2} (8.64 sq mi)
- Elevation: 190 m (620 ft)

Population (2025)
  - Total: 20,096
- Time zone: UTC+1 (CET)
  - Summer (DST): UTC+2 (CEST)
- Postal code: 958 01
- Area code: +421 38
- Vehicle registration plate (until 2022): PE
- Website: www.partizanske.sk

Partizánske (Slovak pronunciation: [ˈpartizaːnske], meaning "partisan town", formerly: Šimonovany, from 1948: Baťovany, Hungarian: Simony) is a town in Trenčín Region, Slovakia.

== Geography ==
The municipality lies at an altitude of 190 metres (620 ft) and covers an area of 22.37 km^{2} (8.64 sq mi) (2025).

Partizánske is located in the northern part of the Danubian Hills around 55 km (34.18 mi) from Nitra and 131 km (81.40 mi) from the capital Bratislava, at the confluence of the Nitra and Nitrica rivers, near the Tribeč mountains. The old village of Veľké Bielice is now part of Partizánske.

== History ==
Partizánske is a young town. Its history starts in 1938–1939, when Jan Antonín Baťa of Zlín and his powerful network of companies built a shoe factory in the cadastral area of Šimonovany municipality. The newly created settlement for workers carried the name of Baťovany and was part of Šimonovany. With the growth of the factory, so grew the settlement. The whole municipality was renamed to Baťovany in 1948 and given town status. As a sign of recognition of local inhabitants fighting in the Slovak National Uprising, the town was renamed Partizánske on 9 February 1949. The factory was renamed by communists to Závody 29. augusta (29 August works), and it produced 30 million pairs of shoes and employed around 10,000 people. However, after a failed privatisation in the 1990s, only a fraction is left now.

== Population ==
Historical population
Year	Pop.	±%
1970	14,539	—
1980	21,639	+48.8%
1991	25,099	+16.0%
2001	24,907	−0.8%
2011	24,115	−3.2%
2021	21,439	−11.1%
Source: Censuses

Population statistic (10 years)
Year	1995	2005	2015	2025
Count	25,586	24,471	23,247	20,096
Difference		−4.35%	−5.00%	−13.55%

Population statistic
Year	2024	2025
Count	20,338	20,096
Difference		−1.18%

It has a population of 20,096 people (31 December 2025).

=== Ethnicity ===
Census 2021 (1+ %)
Ethnicity	Number	Fraction
Slovak	19,432	90.63%
Not found out	1878	8.75%
Total	21,439	

In year 2021 was 21,439 people by ethnicity 19,432 as Slovak, 1878 as Not found out, 123 as Czech, 90 as Romani, 77 as Other, 62 as Hungarian, 27 as Russian, 17 as Rusyn, 17 as Polish, 16 as German, 13 as Irish, 11 as English, 7 as Jewish, 7 as Ukrainian, 6 as Vietnamese, 6 as Italian, 6 as Serbian, 6 as Moravian, 4 as Chinese, 4 as Austrian, 3 as Turkish, 3 as Albanian, 1 as Silesian, 1 as Romanian, 1 as Greek, 1 as French, 1 as Croatian and 1 as Bulgarian.

Note on population: The difference values of population numbers in the table "Population statistic" and in the sections "Ethnicity" & "Religion" is caused by the use of various statistical methods.

=== Religion ===
Census 2021 (1+ %)
Religion	Number	Fraction
Roman Catholic Church	12,141	56.63%
None	6392	29.81%
Not found out	1878	8.76%
Evangelical Church	391	1.82%
Total	21,439	

In year 2021 was 21,439 people by religion 12,141 from Roman Catholic Church, 6392 from None, 1878 from Not found out, 391 from Evangelical Church, 130 from Greek Catholic Church, 100 from Christian Congregations in Slovakia, 87 from Other and not ascertained christian church, 70 from Ad hoc movements, 50 from Other, 43 from Calvinist Church, 39 from Buddhism, 23 from Eastern Orthodox Church, 15 from Islam, 14 from Jehovah's Witnesses, 13 from Paganism and natural spirituality, 10 from Seventh-day Adventist Church, 8 from Hinduism, 8 from United Methodist Church, 7 from Jewish community, 6 from Apostolic Church, 4 from Church of the Brethren, 3 from Czechoslovak Hussite Church, 3 from Church of Jesus Christ of Latter-day Saints, 2 from Old Catholic Church and 2 from Baptists Church.

== Sport ==
The association football team ŠK Slovan Šimonovany plays at the stadium in the east of the town, off the Nemocničná cesta road. The stadium was a former venue for motorcycle speedway from 1958 to 1965 and hosted a final round of the Czechoslovak Individual Speedway Championship in 1961 and 1962.

Another football team FK Tempo Partizánske play at the Rudolfa Jašíka stadium in the south of the town, which is adjacent to and on the right of the ice hockey stadium (Zimný štadión).

== Notable people ==
- Peter Dvorský (born 1951), opera singer
- Miroslav Dvorský (born 1960), opera singer
- Ján Fabo (born 1963), sport shooter
- Petra Popluhárová (born 1988), handball player

== Twin towns – sister cities ==
Partizánske is twinned with:

- Bajina Bašta, Serbia
- Benešov, Czech Republic
- Krapkowice, Poland
- Náchod, Czech Republic
- Svit, Slovakia
- Valašské Meziříčí, Czech Republic
- Vukovar, Croatia

== Gallery ==
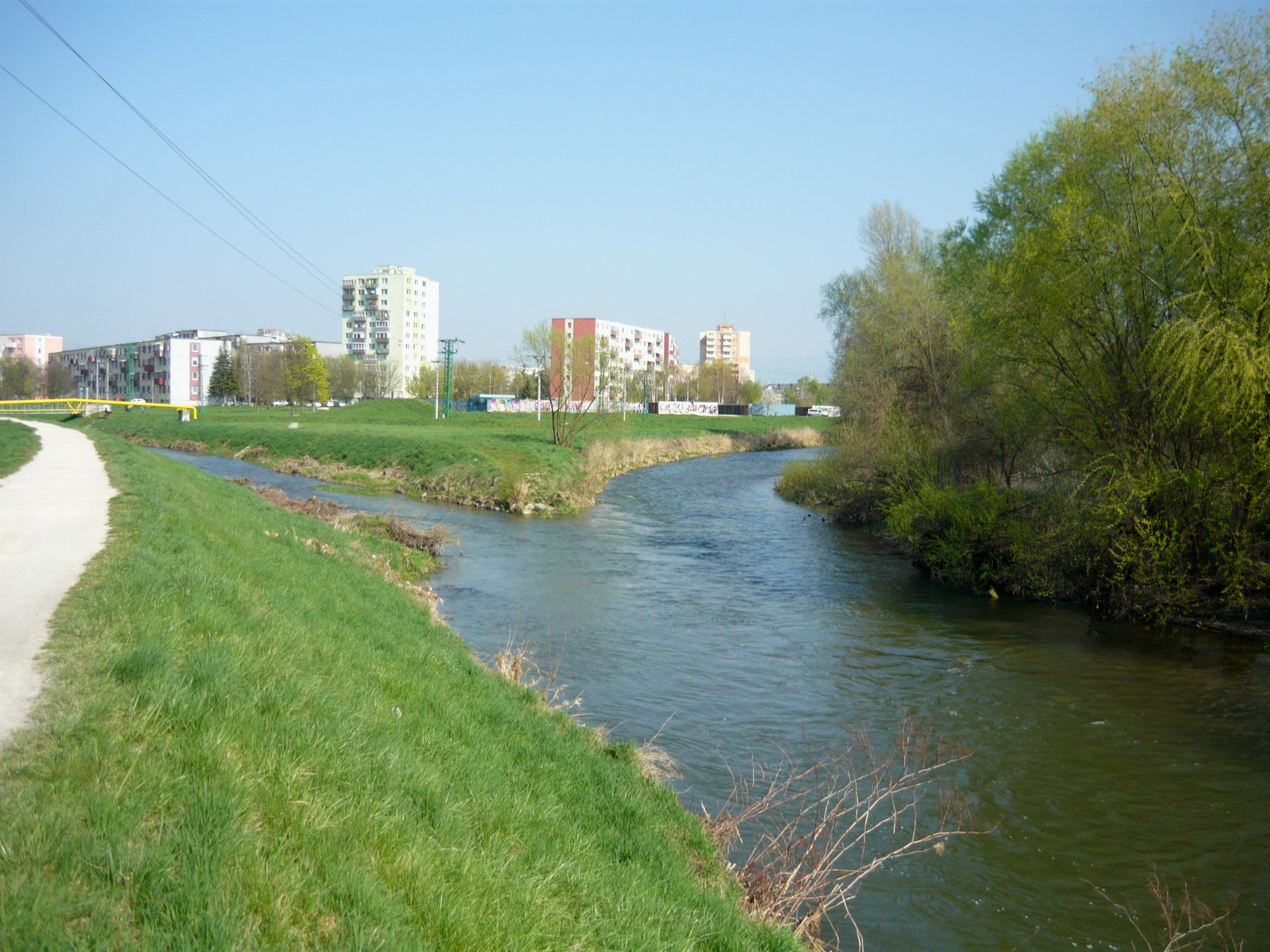
The confluence of the Nitra and Nitrica rivers

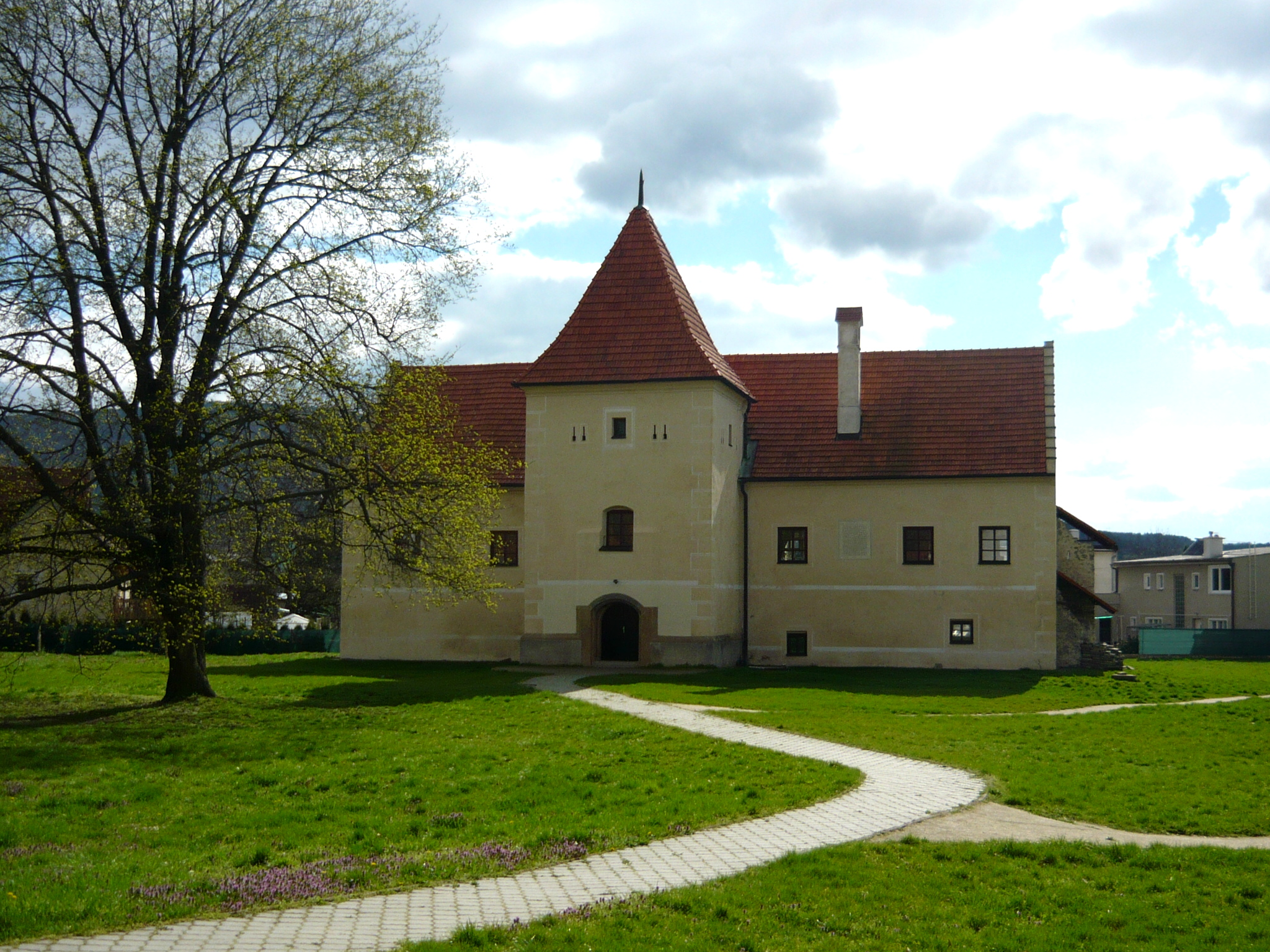
Manor house in Šimonovany

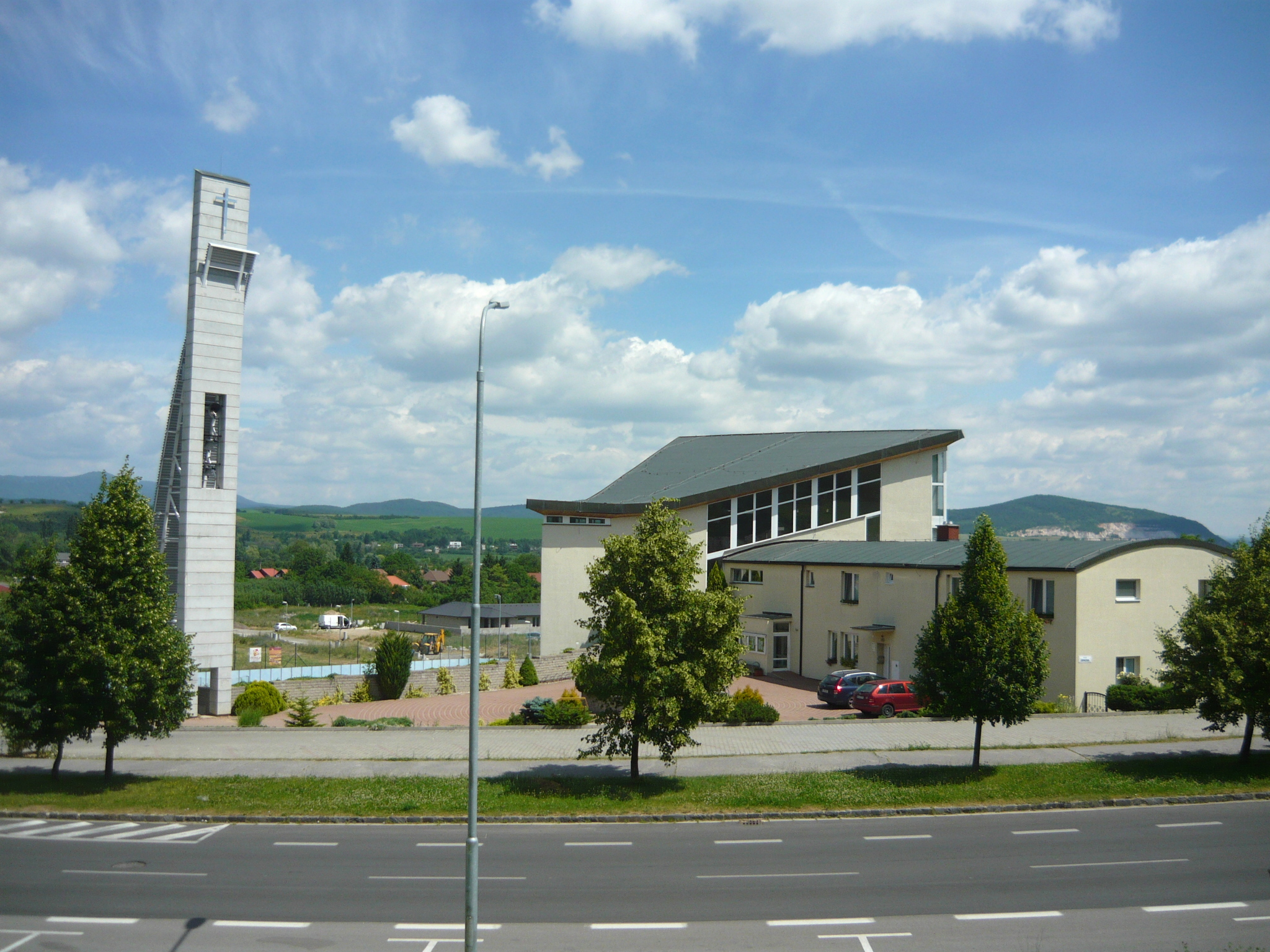
St. Thomas Church in Partizánske

== See also ==
- Svit - another Slovak town founded by the Bata Shoes company.
- List of company towns
