= Etela Farkašová =

Slovak philosopher and writer (born 1943)

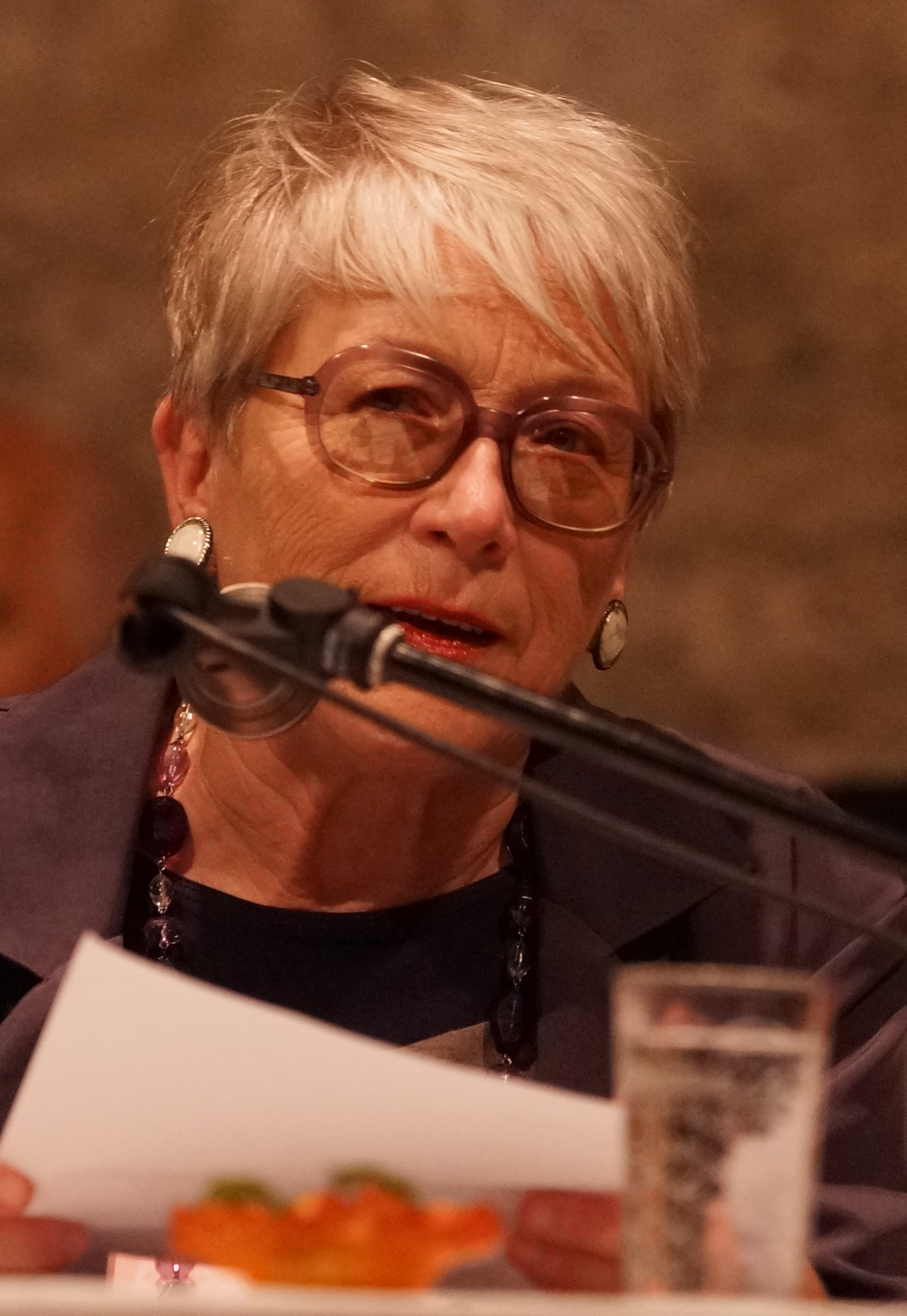
- Born: Etela Zipserová; 5 October 1943 (age 82); Levoča, Slovak Republic
- Education: University of Trnava; Comenius University
- Occupations: Philosopher, writer
- Writing career
- Language: Slovak

Etela Farkašová (née Zipserová; born 5 October 1943) is a Slovak writer and philosopher.

== Biography ==
Etela Farkašová was born on 5 October 1943 in Levoča. She studied Mathematics and Physics at the University of Trnava. Following her graduation, she worked as a high school teacher. At the same time, she studied Philosophy and Sociology at the Comenius University, graduating in 1972. Since then, she has lectured at the Department of Philosophy of the Comenius University. She retired in 2010, but as of 2023 she is still active as an Emeritus Professor of Philosophy as well as a researcher of the Center for Gender Studies at the university. She occasionally translates from German and English.

As a philosopher, Farkašová is interested in epistemology, in particular the relationship between philosophy and science as well as philosophy and art. From 1990s, she has developed interest in Feminist philosophy. She is a member of the Network of East-West Women (NEWW), the Slovak branch of PEN club, Österreichischer Schriftstellerverband and a co-founder of the Slovak female writer club FEMINA.

== Achievements ==
Etela Farkašová debuted as a fiction writer in 1978 with a collection of short stories Reproduction of time (Reprodukcia času), which won the Ivan Krasko Award. She cooperated extensively with Austrian writers and was awarded a medal for developing cultural cooperation between Slovakia and Austria by the Austrian president in 2004. In 2018 she was awarded the Anasoft Litera prize for her book Script (Scenár), which discusses the possibility of living slowly in fast times. In 2018, she was additionally awarded the Crystal Wing Award in the Literature category. As of 2023, she published 14 fiction books.
