= Miroslav Dvorský =

Slovak operatic tenor (born 1960)

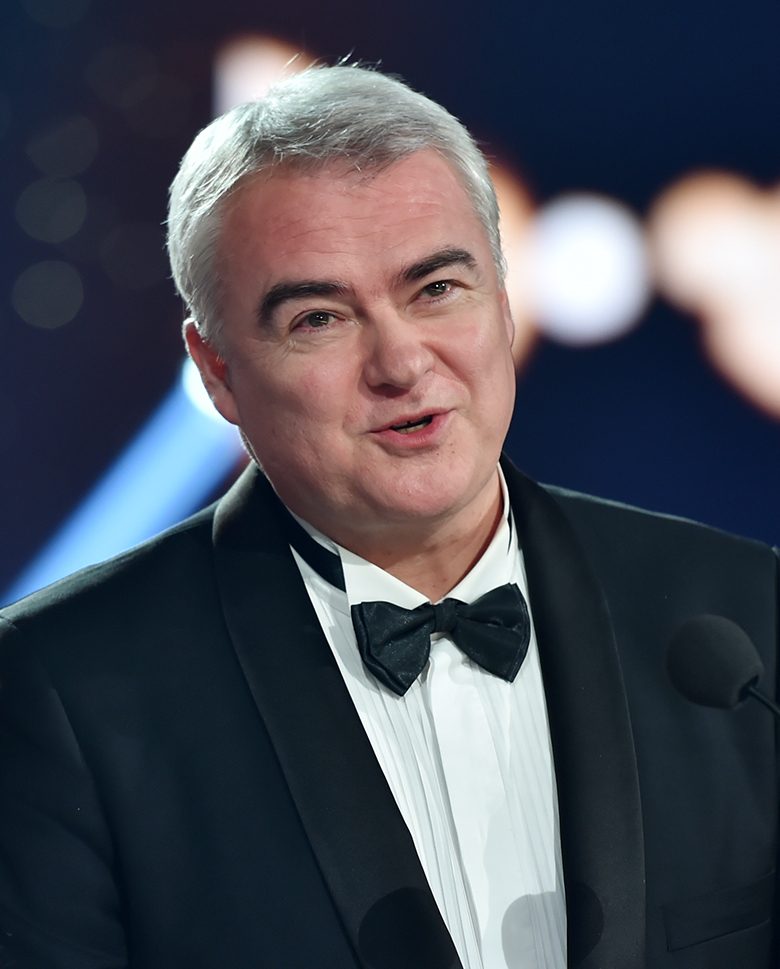
Dvorský in 2017

Miroslav Dvorský (born 16 May 1960) is a Slovak operatic tenor of international renown who has had an active career since the early 1980s.

== Biography ==
Born in Partizánske, Dvorský has a twin brother, Jaroslav Dvorský, who is also an opera singer. He has three more siblings, two of which also have opera careers: Peter Dvorský and Pavol Dvorský. His other brother, Vendelín Dvorský, is an economist.

Dvorský earned a degree in mechanical engineering from the technical school in his native city. He then studied singing at the Bratislava Conservatory under Ida Černecká and at the Academy of Performing Arts in Bratislava. After graduating he received further training from Luciano Silvestri at the L'Accademia di La Scala in Milan. After winning several major singing competitions, he joined the Slovak National Theatre where he made his professional opera debut in 1983.

Dvorský has since appeared in leading roles on the stages of most of the world's great opera houses, including La Scala, the Royal Opera, London, the Opéra National de Paris, the Vienna State Opera, the Maggio Musicale Fiorentino, the Deutsche Oper Berlin, the Teatro Comunale di Bologna, the Teatro Regio di Torino, the Teatro Carlo Felice, the Canadian Opera Company, Opéra de Marseille, the Municipal Theater of Santiago, the Palau de les Arts Reina Sofía, the San Francisco Opera, and the New National Theatre Tokyo among others. His scheduled performances for the 2009–2010 season include Alfred in Johann Strauss II's Die Fledermaus at the Semperoper in Dresden, Cavaradossi in Giacomo Puccini's Tosca at the Hamburg State Opera, Jeník in Bedřich Smetana's The Bartered Bride at the Prague National Theatre, Laca Klemeň in Leoš Janáček's Jenůfa at the Teatro Real in Madrid and in Prague, and The Prince in Antonín Dvořák's Rusalka at the Norwegian National Opera.

== Awards ==
In 2019 he won the Crystal Wing Awards in the theatre and audio-visual art category.
