= Ivan Pavle =

Slovak painter (born 1955)

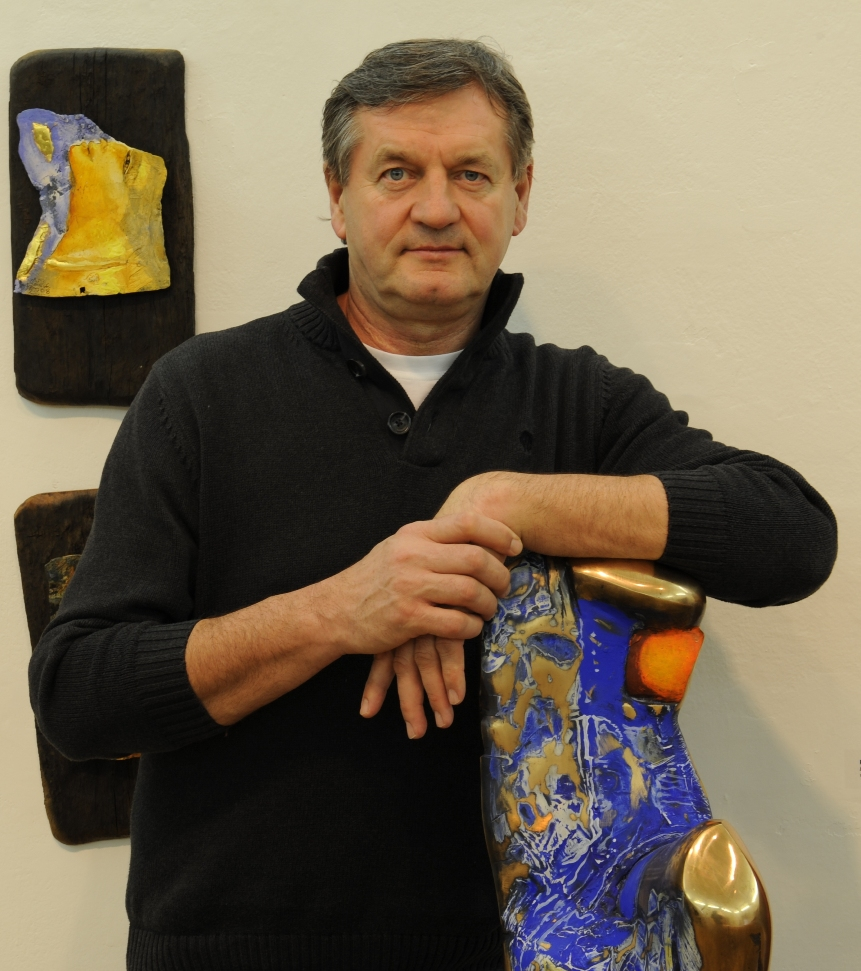
- Pavle in 2013
- Born: 8 March 1955 (age 71); Galanta, Czechoslovakia (modern day Slovakia)
- Education: Academy of Fine Arts in Bratislava
- Occupation: Painter
- Partner: Soňa Pavleová
- Children: 2
- Website: ivanpavle.sk

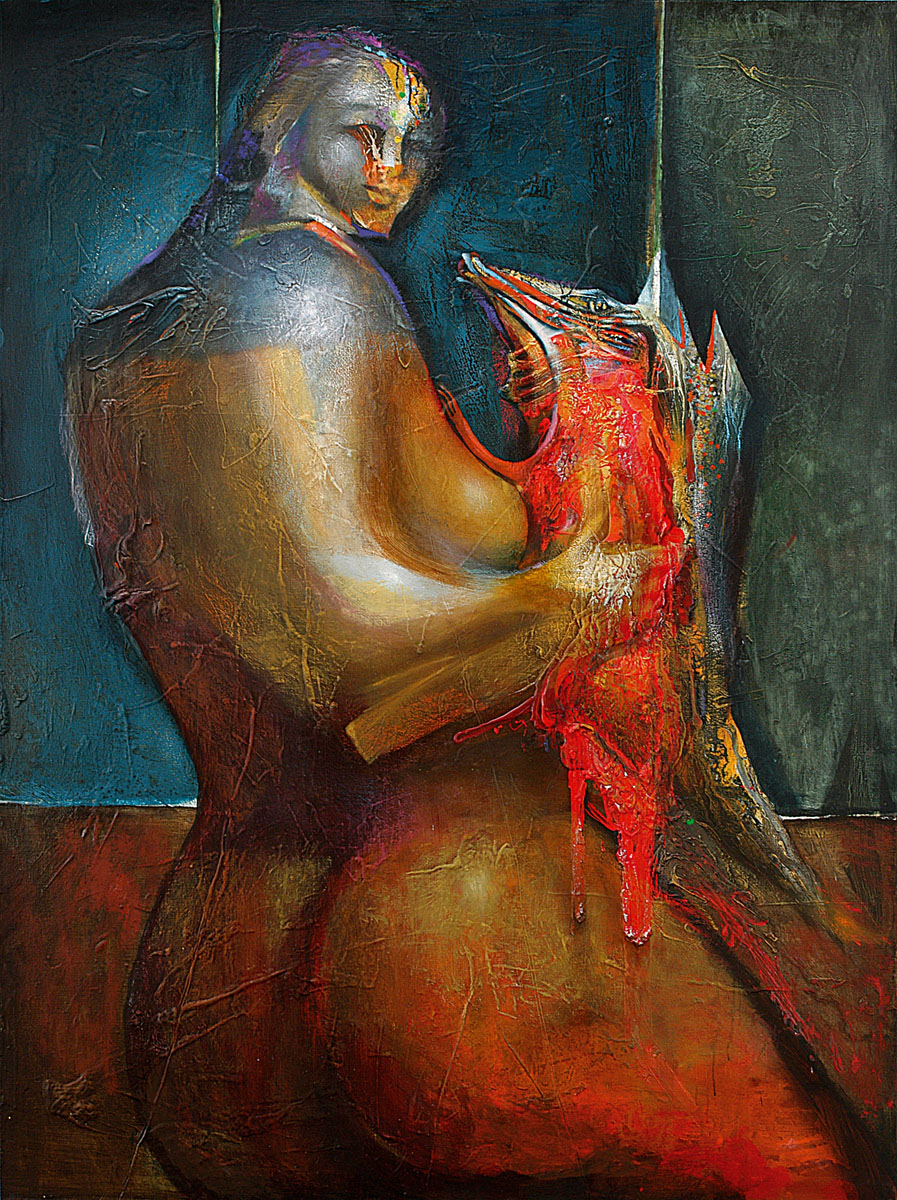
Žena s líškou - 200x150 - akryl, olej - 2004

Ivan Pavle (born March 8, 1955) is a Slovak painter with a distinct style focusing on the human form. He combines classical painting with the results of experimental painting to play with sensory perception.

== Life ==
Pavle was born in Galanta, Slovakia to Matej Pavle and Alžbeta Pavleová. He grew up in Prievidza with two brothers, Matej and Slavomír. He completed primary school in Prievidza in 1970. After attending high school in Tvrdošín, Pavle studied engineering before graduating and going on to study fine art at the Academy of Fine Arts in Bratislava under professors Dezider Castiglione and Ivan Vychlopen. He graduated in 1981 and married his Fine Arts classmate, Soňa Oravcová. They have two children. Since then, Pavle has pursued an artistic career focused on painting, drawing, graphics, and sculpture.

== Style and methods ==
Pavle's art is characterized by figurative painting, nudes, torsos, and faces covered by masks. The representation of the human body is further reinforced by emphasising the gestures, body shapes in motion, and relationship studies of two and more characters.

Another major and recurring theme in Pavle’s work is mythology, which is demonstrated in an ongoing cycle of paintings about Babylon, as well as in other art pieces showing fictitious landscapes and mysterious characters with animal features.

His work has been noted for its intensity and distinctive style. Pavle employs older techniques in combination with his own specific artistic processes. His work combines tradition and respect for the material while focusing on contemporary content.

== Monograph ==
In 2015, the Slovak publisher Herial published Pavle, a Slovak-English monograph on Pavle written by fine art theorist Ivan Jančár. In this book, Jančár writes about Pavle's work:

His painting expression was not aimed at the search for a fashionable expression, but at the essence of artistic creation. Painting merged with his life - he was always a painter with strong self-discipline. From the beginning he was an exemplary figuralist, he studied matter, analyzed the possibilities of decomposition of this matter, movement or its sequences. He depicted human emotions in relaxed mental states. It didn't matter whether the figures had a distinctly expressive or meditative character, they always had a strong expression with a thorough knowledge of anatomy.

— Ivan Jančár, Pavle

== Gallery ==
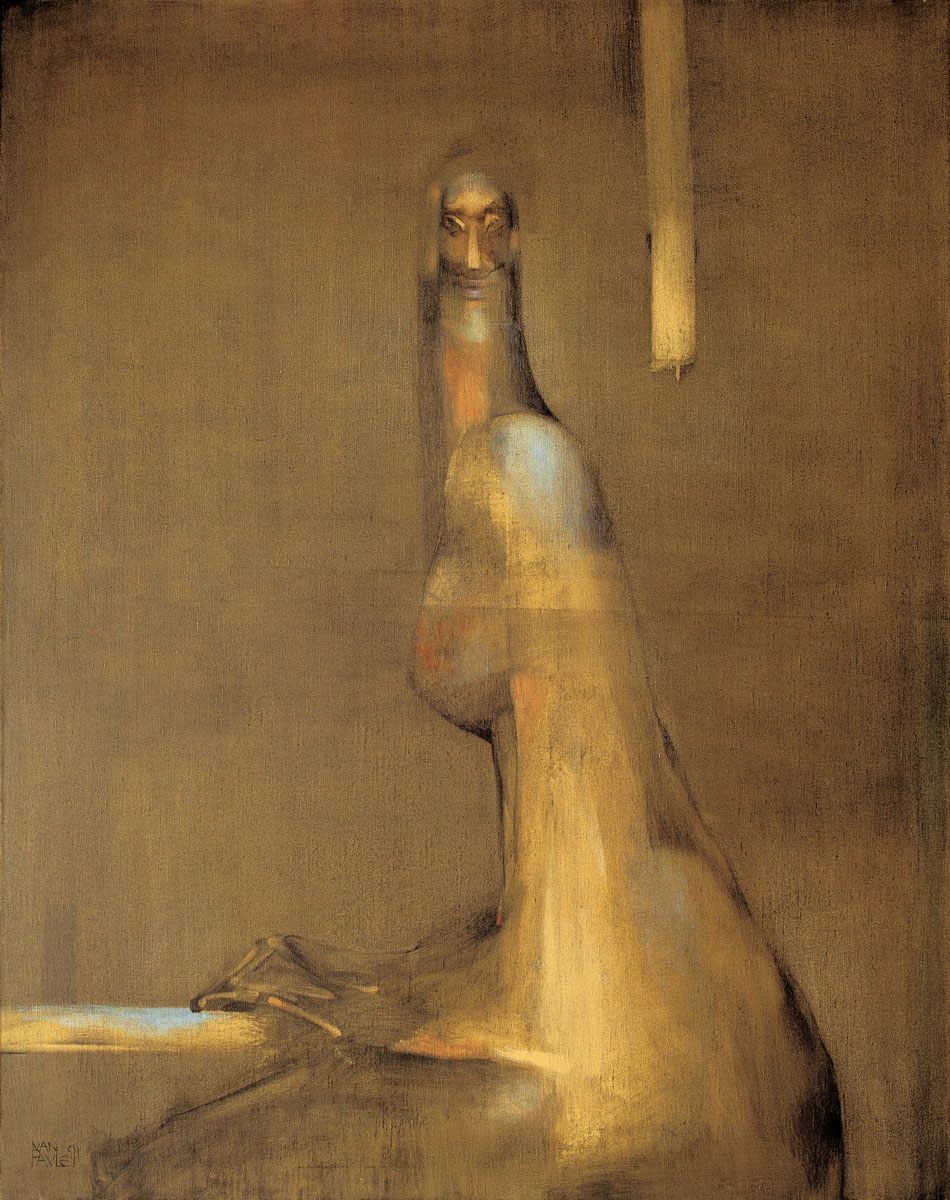
Lost day 145x120-oil-1991

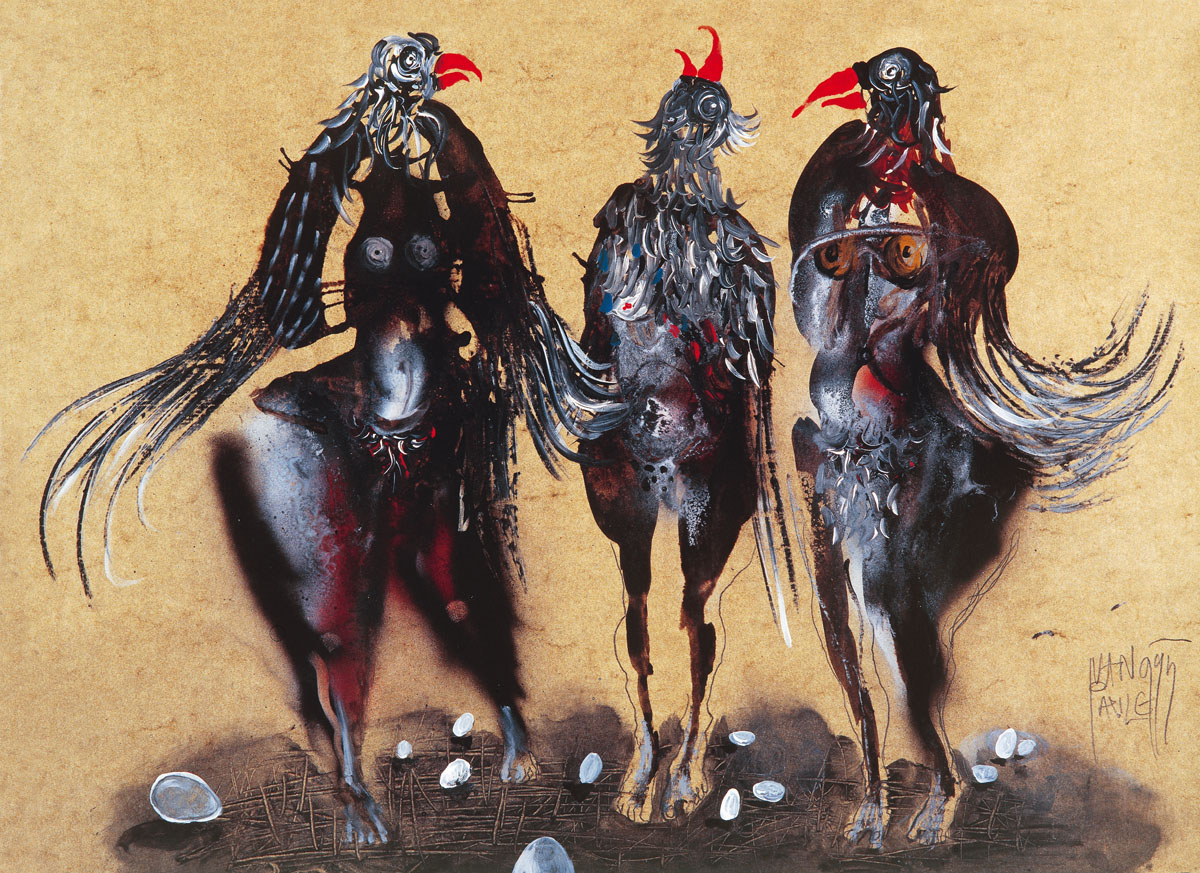
Interview 50x70-oil-1995

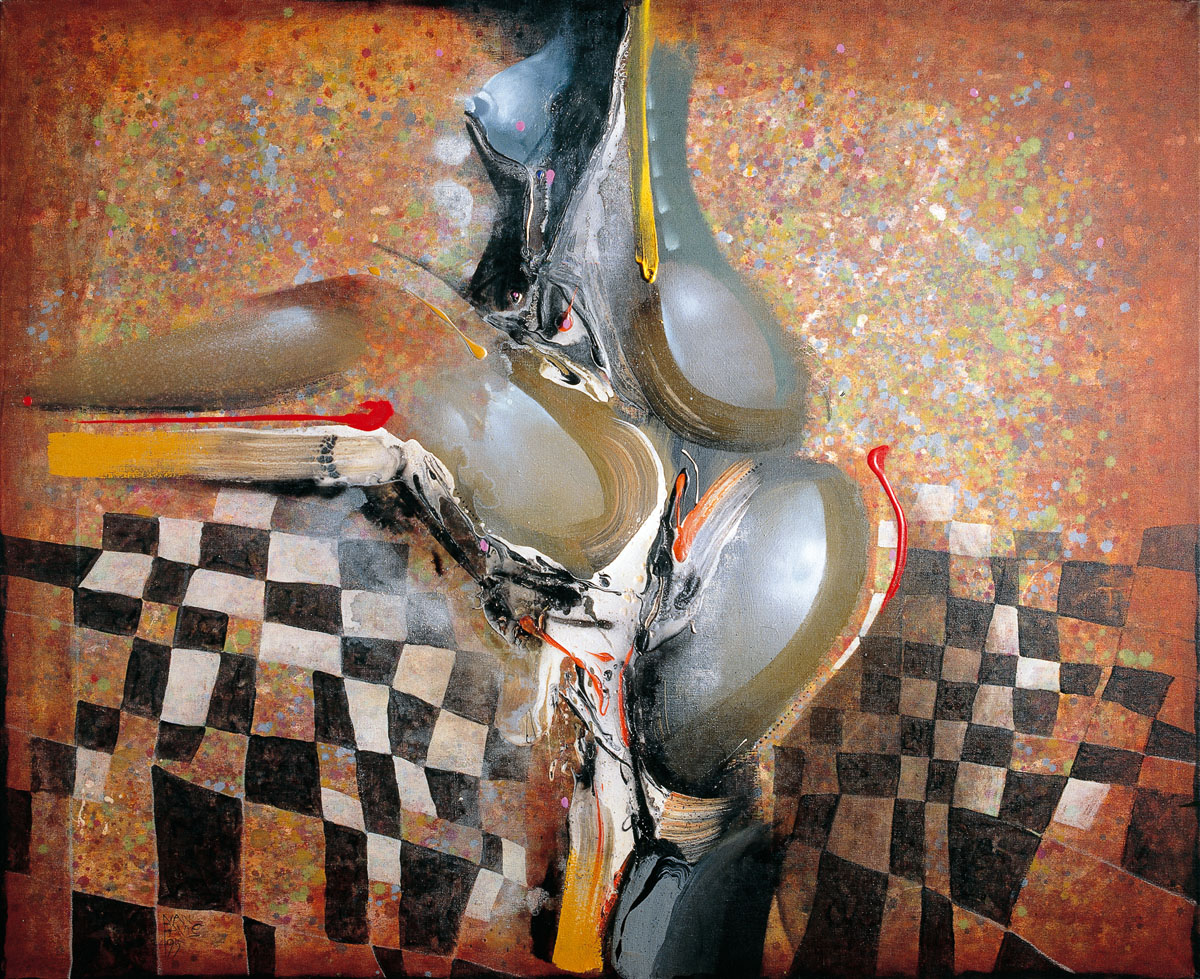
After bath II 130x160-oil-1995

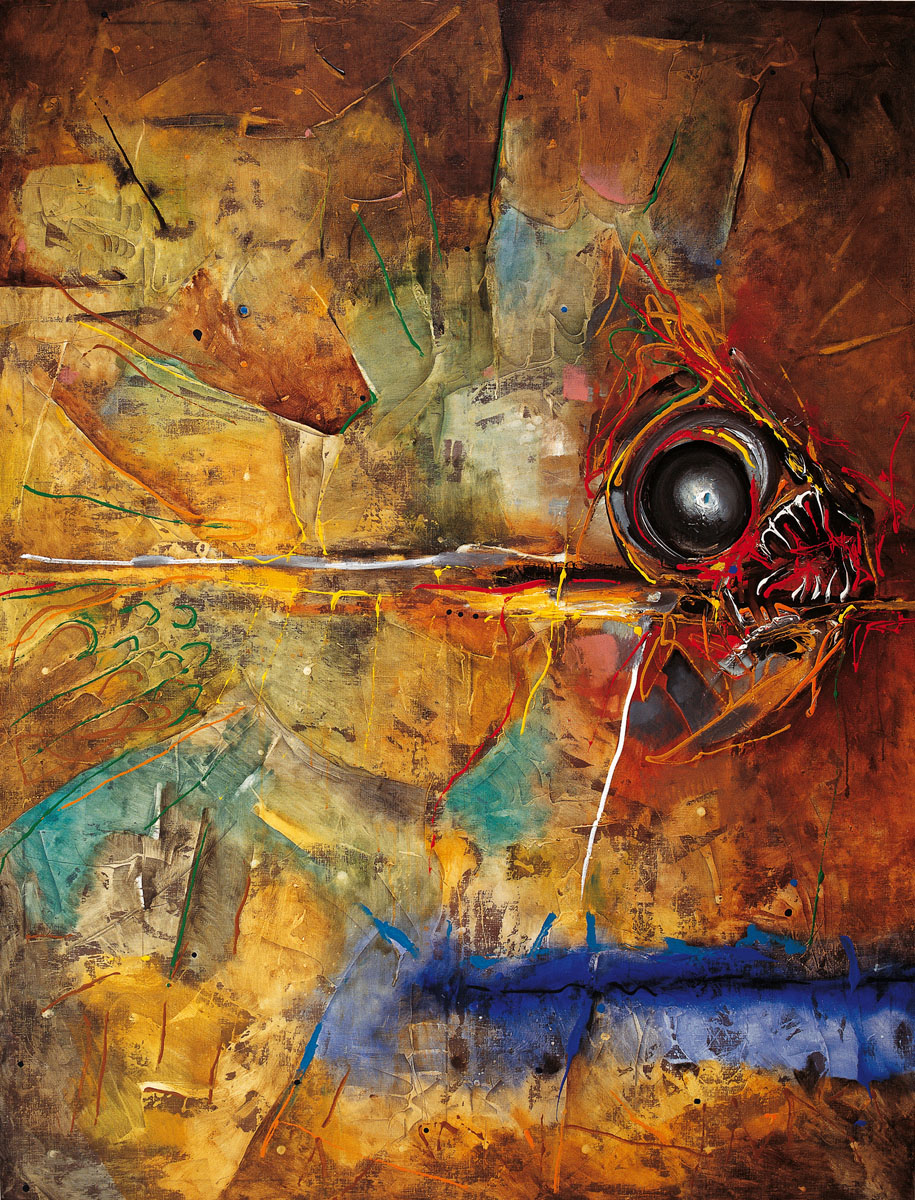
Quiet alliance A 200x150-oil-1995

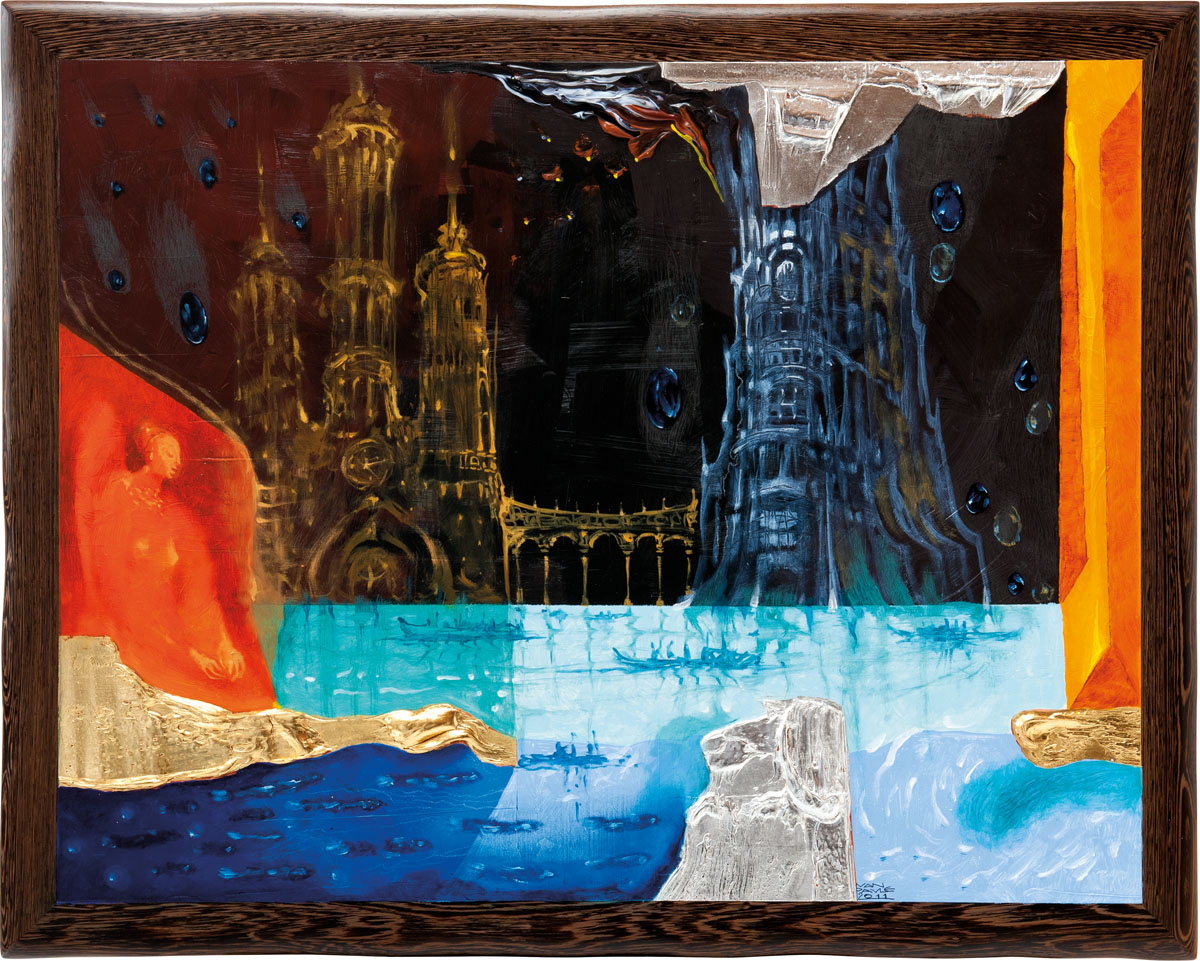
Siesta 80x100-acryl, oil, gold, silver-2001

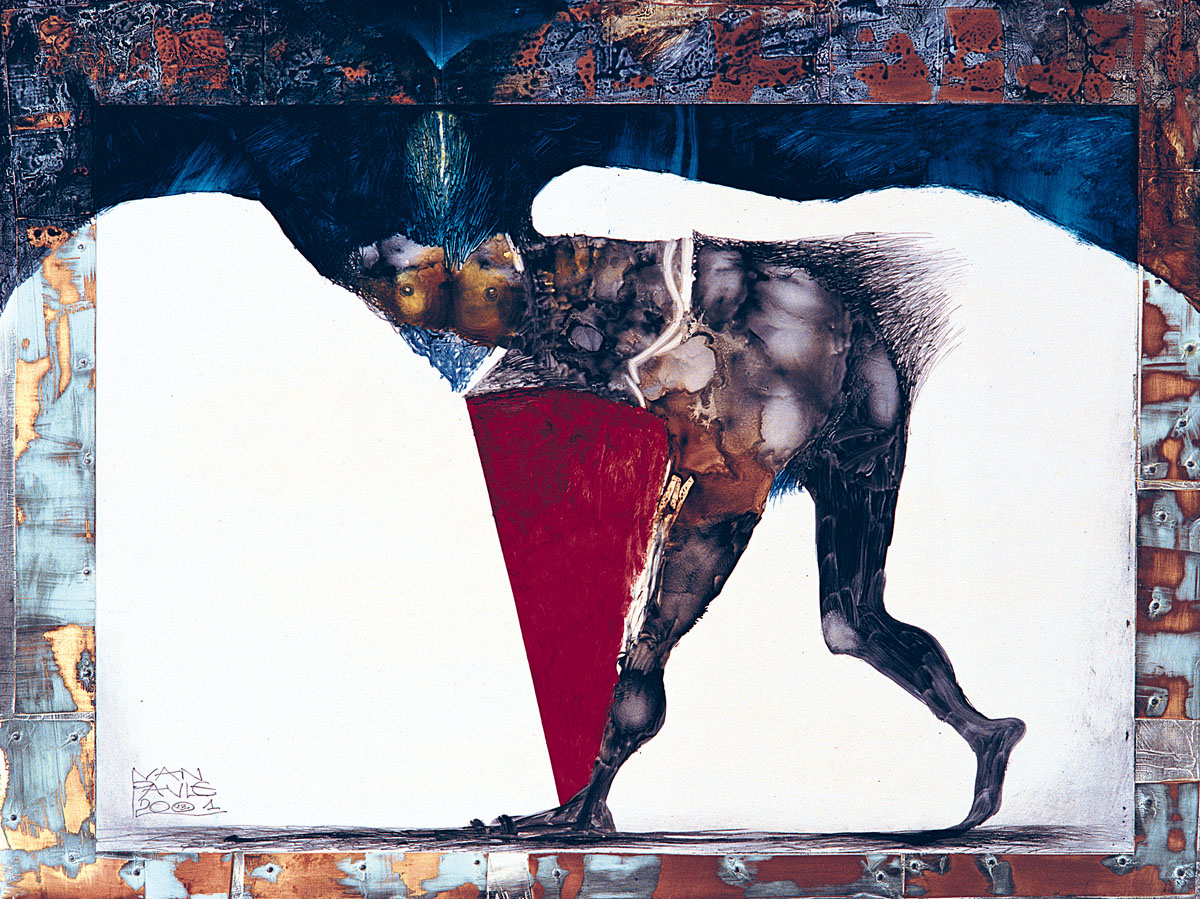
Figurante 50x70-oil-2001

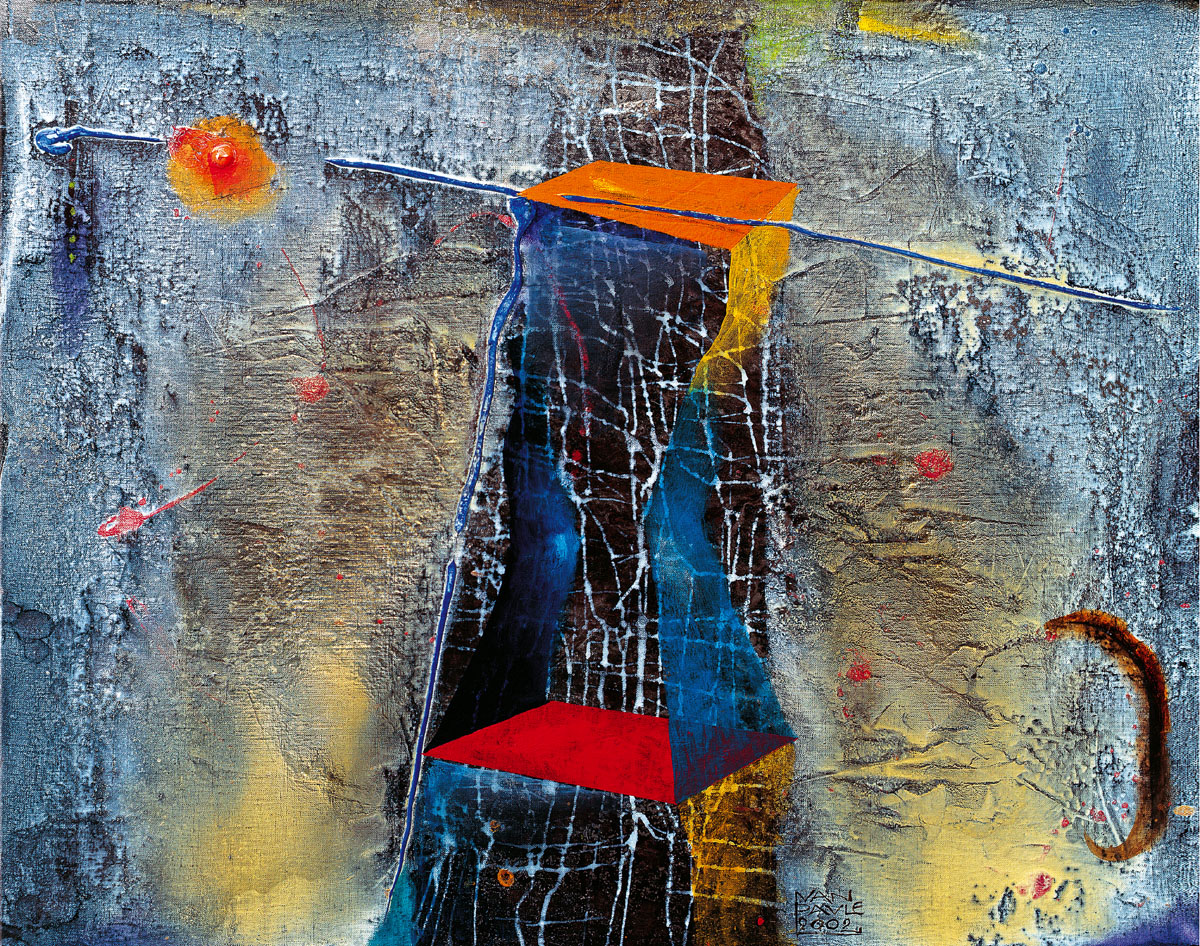
Blue citadel 80x100-olej na platne-2002

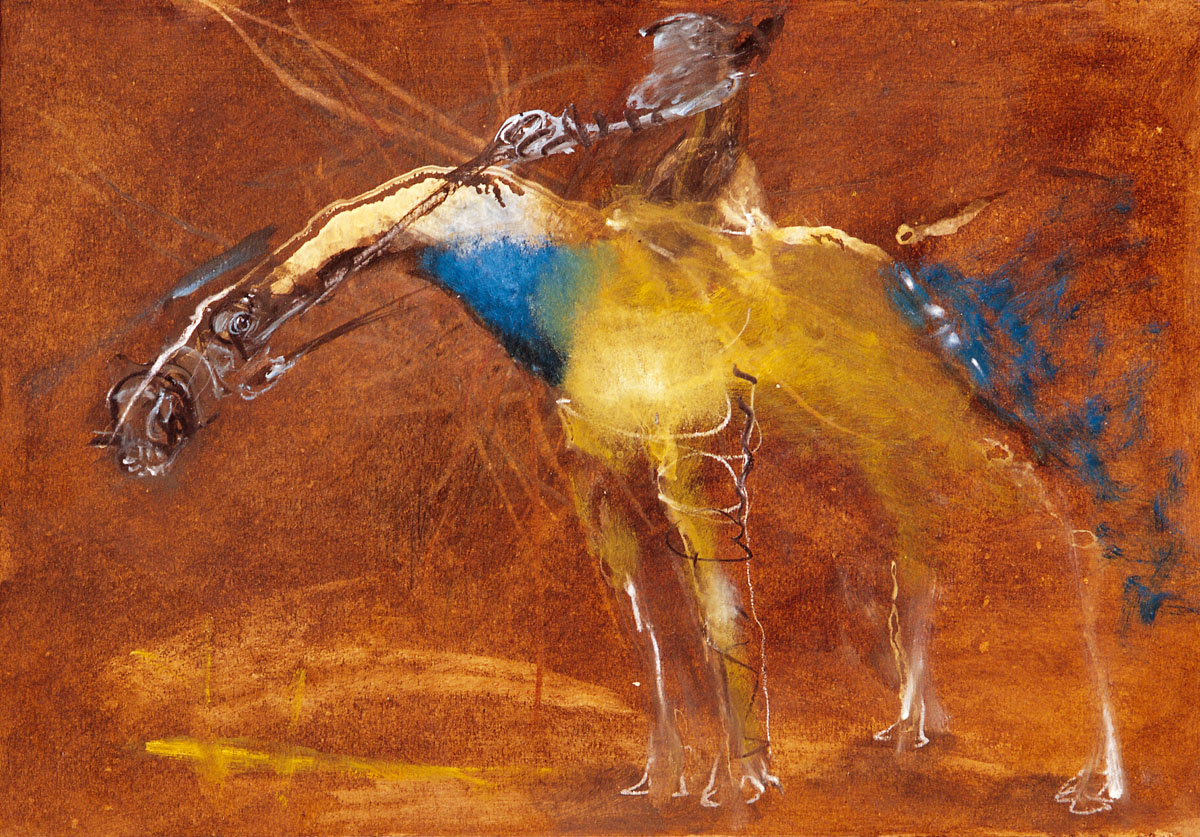
Ride B 40x50-oil-1999

== Exhibitions and awards ==
Pavle‘s works have been exhibited in Slovak and foreign galleries in Poland, Germany, Netherlands, Austria, France, Monaco, Italy, Thailand, and the USA.

Pavle attended numerous creative workshops, mainly in the United States and France, where he was awarded the Jury Prize at the International Festival of Painting in Cagnes sur Mer in 1989. His works are represented in galleries and private collections around the world:

- 1985 Turčianske múzeum A. Kmeťa (with Ján Hlavatý), Martin (Slovakia)
- 1986 Finkova kúria, Zvolen, (Slovakia)
- 1987
  - Československé kultúrne stredisko (with Oto Bachorík), Katowice,
  - Chelm, Varšava (Poland)
  - Výstavná sieň mladých (with Stano Stankoci), Bratislava (Slovakia)
- 1988
  - Galéria L. Novomeského (with Oto Bachorík and Stanislav Stankoci), Bratislava (Slovakia)
  - Galéria F. Studeného (with Oto Bachorík), Nitra (Slovakia)
- 1989 Galéria C. Majerníka, Bratislava (Slovakia)
- 1990 Galéria mesta Bratislavy, Bratislava (Slovakia)
- 1991
  - Galéria Štúdia S (with Soňa Pavleová), Bratislava (Slovakia)
  - Galerie Atelierhof, Brémy (Germany)
  - Nassauische Sparkasse (with Alex Kraščenič) Montabaur (Germany)
  - Galerie de Gang, Delft (Netherlands)
  - Gallery Art Fonctionel, Metz (France)
  - Siemens Nixdorf (with Stano Černý, Alex Kračšenič and Róbert Jančovič)
  - Kolín nad Rýnom (Germany)
- 1992
  - Dom slovenskej kultúry (with Oto Bachorík), Praha (Czech)
  - Galéria NOVA, Bratislava (Slovakia)
  - Europahaus, Graz (Austria)
  - Galéria M. A. Bazovského (with Jozef Hobor), Trenčín (Slovakia)
- 1993
  - Galerie Mitte (with Stanislavom Stankocim), Vienna (Austria)
  - Terre ou Art, Verdun (France)
  - Studio Bauform, Kolín nad Rýnom (Germany)
  - Veľvyslanectvo Slovenskej republiky, Bonn (Germany)
- 1994
  - Žltý dom Vincenta van Gogha (with Oto Bachorík), Poprad (Slovakia)
  - Art Gallery Heeze, Eidhoven (Netherlands)
  - De Brouwerij, Weelde (Netherlands)
- 1995
  - Galéria mesta Bratislavy, Bratislava (Slovakia)
  - Galéria NOVA, Bratislava (Slovakia)
  - Kunst RAI’95, Amsterdam (Netherlands)
- 1996 Rezidencia Slovenskej republiky, New York (US)
- 1997 Gallery MOCA (Museum of Contemporary Art), Washington (US)
- 1999 Galéria NOVA, Bratislava (Slovakia)
- 2001 Gallery Missing Link, Sarasota, Florida (US)
- 2004
  - Cité internationale des arts in Paris
  - Galéria NOVA, Bratislava (Slovakia)
- 2005 Danubiana, Meulensteen Art Museum, Bratislava (Slovakia)
- 2008 Slovenská ambasáda, (with Oto Bachorík), Roma (Italy)
- 2009 Herzliya, (with V. Petrík, M. Kellenberger, P. Pollág, J. Oravec, Š.Polák) (Izrael)
- 2011
  - 15 umelcov v Galérii SPP, Bratislava (Slovakia)
  - Slovak art for Slovak culture evening in Monaco
- 2012
  - Spectrum Art v Galérii SPP, Bratislava (Slovakia)
  - Private studio exhibition, Tribecca - New York (USA)
- 2013 Galéria Jána Koniarika v Trnave (Slovakia)
- 2014 Umenie lieči (33. Renomovaných umělců), NOÚ Bratislava (Slovakia)
- 2015 Crystal Wing Awards, Visual Arts

== Virtual tours ==
Pavle often makes virtual tours of his exhibitions with the stated goal of making them "immortal". The links for two of them may be found below.

== Books about author ==
- Daniel Hevier – Ivan Pavle: Publishing house, Galéria NOVA, 2005
- Ivan Jančár - Pavle: Publishing house, Herial, s.r.o. (2015)
