= Herbert Müller (handball coach) =

Romanian-German handballer and coach (born 1962)

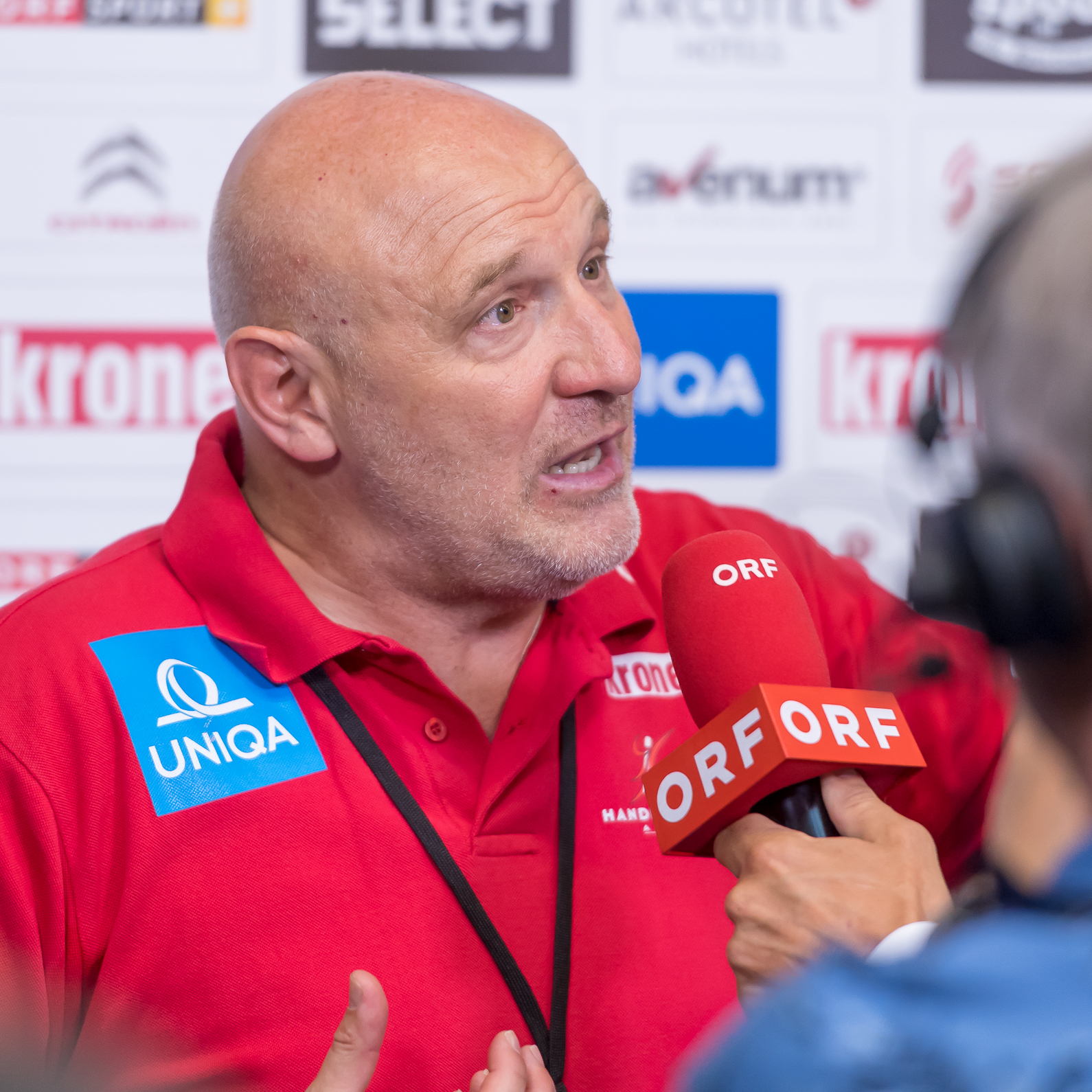
Herbert Müller in 2017

Herbert Müller (born 3 September 1962 in Timișoara) is a Romanian-German handball coach and former handball player. He is currently in charge of Thüringer HC of the German Bundesliga, and beside his club duties he also serves as the head coach of the Austria women's national handball team.

== Career ==
He was born to ethnic Banat Swabians parents, Franz and Anna Müller in Timișoara, and started to play handball for the local team Poli Timișoara in 1976. Four years later he left the country with his family because of the hard times under the communist regime in Romania and settled in Germany. He continued his playing career at TSG Augsburg, where he ended his career in 1988.

He began coaching in 1984 at Augsburg, while he was still a player. In 1999 he took the hot seat of 1. FC Nürnberg Handball, with whom he achieved his biggest successes, winning two domestic championships and two domestic cup titles. He also won the EHF Challenge Cup in 2004.

In 2008, Müller became the head coach of the Romanian team Rulmentul Brașov. He spent a year and a half with Rulmentul before the club developed financial problems.

Müller moved back to Germany, signing for Thüringer HC in July 2010. He brought the Bundesliga title and the German Cup to THC in 2011 for the first time in the history of the club.

== Personal life ==
He is in relationship with the Thüringer HC player Petra Popluhárová. They have two children together. He also has two daughters, Nadia (born 2001) and Vanessa (born 2007) from a previous relationship. His brother, Helfried, is also a handball expert, serving as the assistant coach of Thüringer HC.

Müller was a mathematics docent at the Institut für Integration in Nuremberg.
