= Petra Popluhárová =

Slovak handball player (born 1988)

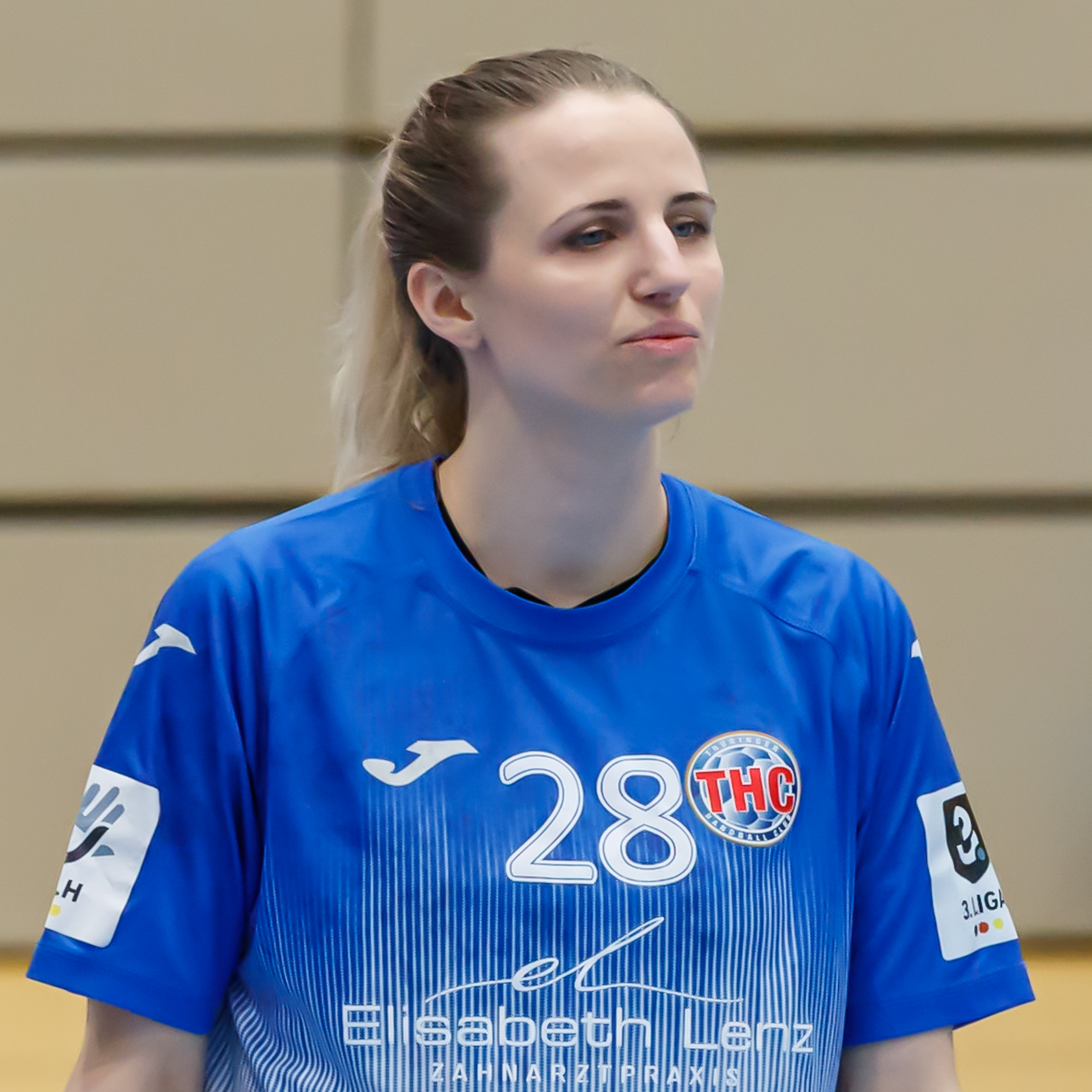
- Popluhárová playing for Thüringer HC B in 2023

Personal information
- Born: 23 August 1988 (age 37); Partizánske, Czechoslovakia
- Nationality: Slovak
- Height: 1.76 m (5 ft 9 in)
- Playing position: Left Back

Petra Popluhárová (born 23 August 1988) is a Slovak handball player.

== Career ==
Petra Popluhárová was born on 23 August 1988 in Partizánske.

She started her professional career with the local team HK Slávia Partizánske. In 2006 she transferred to German club 1. FC Nürnberg Handball 2009. In 2008 she returned to Slovakia to study at the Comenius University and played two seasons with HK Slovan Duslo Šaľa.

From 2010 played again in Germany with the team Thüringer HC, where she contributed to four German championship titles. Following the title win in the 2014/2015 session, Popluhárová retired from elite handball to focus on raising her family but continued playing for the B team of Thüringer HC.

Popluhárová represented Slovakia in the European Handball Championship in 2013.

== Family ==
Together with her partner, the handball coach Herbert Müller, Popluhárová has two children. She missed the 2013/2014 session due to pregnancy.
