= Veľké Bielice =

Coordinates: 48°38′N 18°21′E

- Village
- Interactive map of Veľké Bielice
- Country: Slovakia
- Region: Trenčín
- District: Partizánske
- First mentioned: 1078

Area
  - Total: 27.788 km^{2} (10.729 sq mi)

Population (2010-01-01)
  - Total: 2,139
  - Density: 76.98/km^{2} (199.4/sq mi)
- Postal code: 958 04
- Area code: +421-38
- Car plate: PE

Veľké Bielice is a part of the town and municipality of Partizánske in Partizánske District in the Trenčín Region of western Slovakia. It is well known for its football clubs, that have been active for over 60 years. The village also has rich cultural life with folk bands and various drama clubs. Romano-catholic church of St. Elizabeth of Hungary situated here was built between 1723 – 1759, but historians suspect it was already built on different location in the 14th century. Nowadays church is part of Bielice's cemetery.

== History ==
In historical records the village was first mentioned in 1078. In 1386 Bielice became personal property of Forgáč family. From 1884 the village became during 12 years an important traffic hub thanks to establishment of railway. The village became part of Partizanske district in 1976.

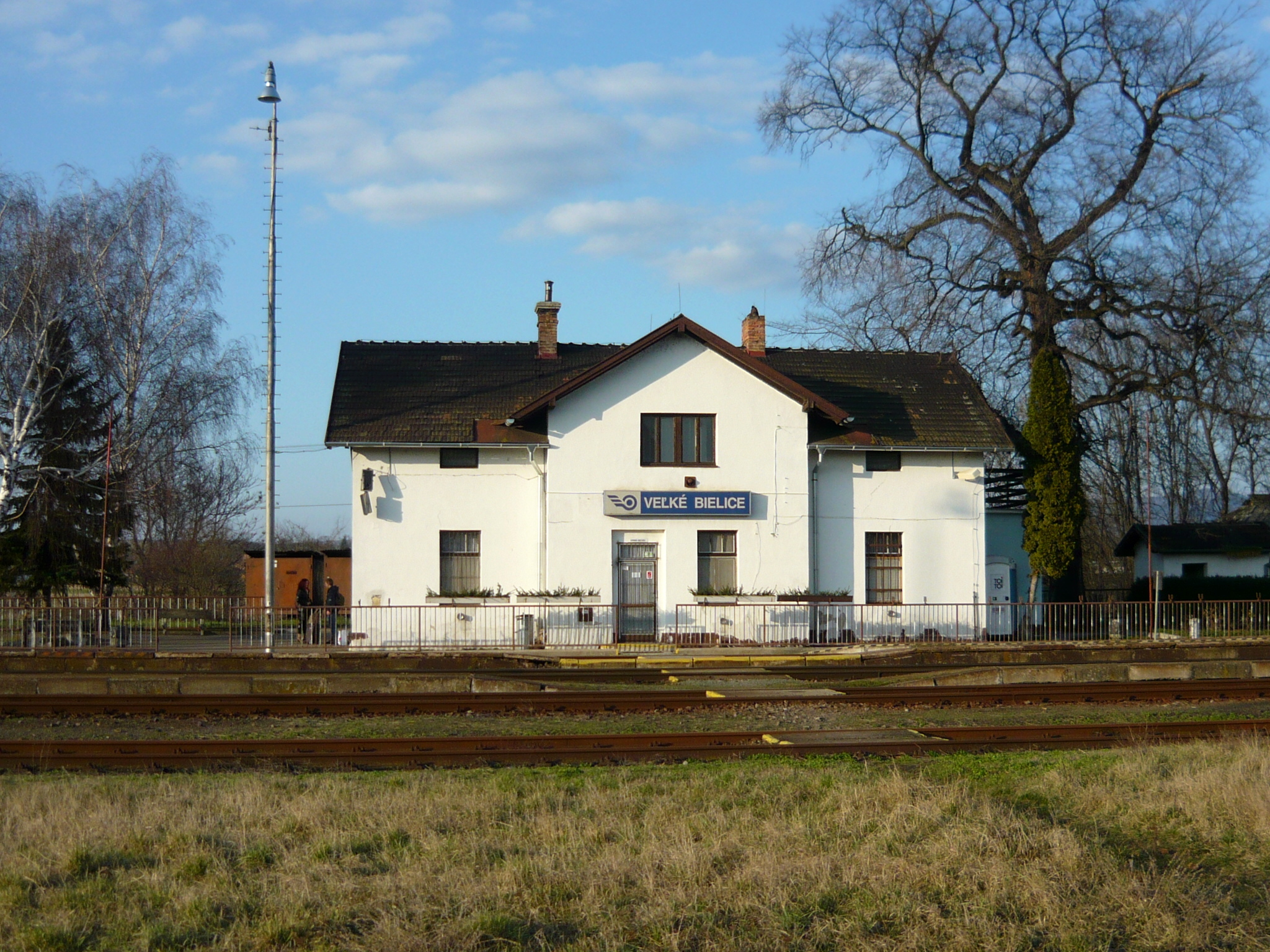
The old railway station

== Geography ==
Veľké Bielice sits north-east from the town of Topolcany by the river Nitrica. It has a population of about 1,983 people.
