= Marek Mach (activist) =

Slovak activist and entrepreneur

Marek Mach (born 2001 or 2002) is a Slovak activist, entrepreneur, co-founder and chairman of civic association Mladí, an organization known for leading the Youth Against Fascism initiative (Mladí proti fašizmu, founded in 2016).

In 2018, Mach was awarded the 'Novinárska cena' Journalism Award for an article he wrote and published on the Youth Against Fascism website.

With Ondrej Vrábel, Mach established the civic association Mladí, which currently runs various charitable projects, including Dúhy.sk (Slovak social network for queer people), Youth Against Fascism (Mladí proti fašizmu), Youth For Climate (Mladí za klímu) and Youth News (Správy Mladí).
