= Bucciero SVIT =

SVIT

General information
- Type: Civil training and touring aircraft
- National origin: Italy
- Designer: Renato Bucciero
- Number built: at least 2

History
- First flight: 2 July 1968

The Bucciero SVIT, (SVIT - Studio per un Velivolo da Instruzione e Turismo, English:study of an aircraft for training and touring), was a single engine, mid-wing, training and touring aircraft designed and constructed by a group of Alitalia staff in the 1960s, at least two of which were built.

== Design and development ==
The all-metal, two-seat Bucciero SVIT was designed by an Alitalia airline pilot, Renato Bucciero. Gastone Canal, an engineer with the same airline, assisted with its construction which began in July 1966. Later, plans for the production of three more, slightly refined SVITs involved nine more of Bucciero's Aeritalia colleagues.

The SVIT was a fairly conventional single-engined aircraft with side-by-side seating for two, though Bucciero favoured a mid wing design rather than the more common low wing. The wing had constant chord, rounded tips and dihedral (aircraft) of 2.5° throughout, built around a two spar torsion box. Its trailing edge carried slotted flaps. The rectangular, low set, tailplane was of the all moving type with full span anti-tabs and the straight tapered fin and rudder was assisted by a small dorsal extension and an underside fin.

The fuselage forward of the cabin was circular in cross section, built around a tube steel frame. Non-inflammable plastic was used for the engine cowling, with aluminium sheet behind. The cabin and tapering rear fuselage had a rectangular cross section and was a semi-monocoque structure. The port side of the Plexiglass canopy hinged upwards for access to the cabin, which was fitted with dual controls. A port side door provided access to a baggage compartment behind the seats. The fixed tricycle undercarriage had fuselage mounted cantilever steel spring legs; the main wheels had brakes and the nosewheel was steerable.

Initially the SVIT was powered by an 85 hp (63 kW) Continental C85 flat four engine. This was used for its first flight (2 July 1968) and took it through to certification in April 1969. That engine was then immediately replaced with a 100 hp (75 kW) Continental O-200. There were plans to build three more SVITs with this engine, modifications to the undercarriage, a sliding canopy and a rounded rear decking but only one was completed. This SVIT 70 was scheduled to fly in the Summer of 1971. Registered I-FABO, it was exhibited at the Turin Air Show in June 1972.

== Specifications ==
Data from Jane's All the World's Aircraft 1970/1

General characteristics

- Capacity: 2
- Length: 5.55 m (18 ft 3 in)
- Wingspan: 7.50 m (24 ft 7 in)
- Height: 2.28 m (7 ft 6 in)
- Wing area: 9.64 m^{2} (103.8 sq ft) gross
- Empty weight: 420 kg (926 lb)
- Max takeoff weight: 675 kg (1,488 lb)
- Powerplant: 1 × Continental O-200-A 4-cylinder horizontally opposed air cooled piston, 75 kW (100 hp)
- Propellers: 2-bladed McCauley, 1.85 m (6 ft 1 in) diameter

Performance

- Maximum speed: 201 km/h (125 mph, 109 kn) at sea level
- Cruise speed: 175 km/h (109 mph, 94 kn) maximum at 2,500 m (8,200 ft)
- Service ceiling: 3,962 m (12,999 ft) service
- Rate of climb: 3.8 m/s (750 ft/min) at sea level
