= Corte di Cadore =

Company town in Borca di Cadore, Italy

- Company village
- Interactive map of Corte di Cadore
- Coordinates: 46.4311°N 12.2331°E
- Country: Italy
- Region: Veneto
- Province: Belluno
- Municipality: Borca di Cadore
- Construction: 1954–1963
- Founded by: Enrico Mattei

Corte di Cadore, also known as Villaggio ENI, is a tourist and residential settlement located near Borca di Cadore in the Dolomites, Italy. It was commissioned by Eni president Enrico Mattei as a holiday village for employees of the company and their families and was designed by architect Edoardo Gellner between 1954 and 1963.

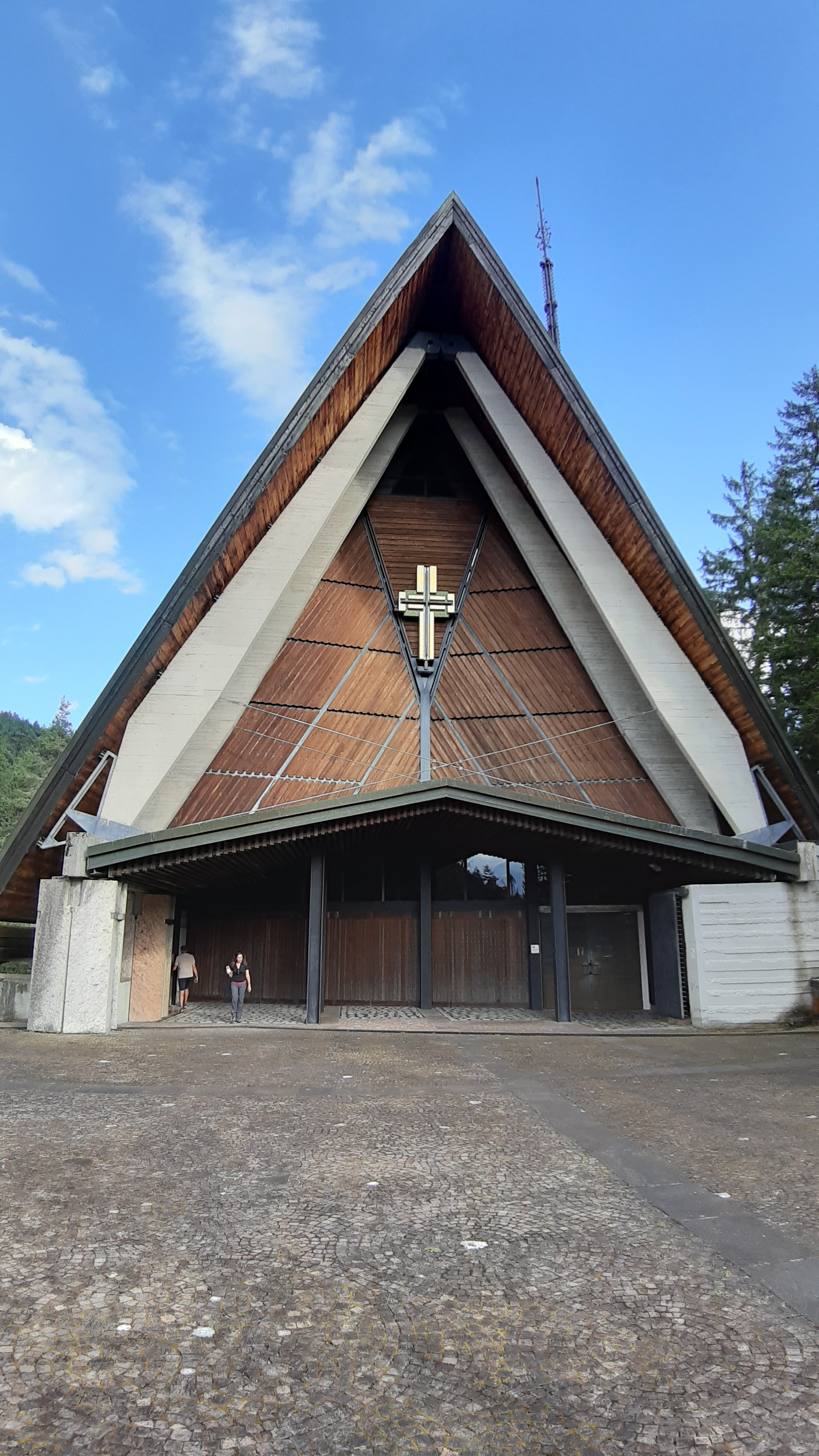
The church of Our Lady of Cadore

The settlement was built on an area of about 200 hectares on the slopes of Monte Antelao, where Gellner developed a modern interpretation of traditional Alpine architecture, integrated with the natural landscape. The complex included around 270 houses, a hotel, a residence, a campsite, public facilities and a large holiday colony for about 600 children. The village church was designed by Gellner together with Carlo Scarpa.

The project represented one of the most ambitious examples of Italian company towns of the post-war period, combining architecture, landscape planning and social facilities. Designed for a community of several thousand users, the settlement reflected Gellner's interest in the relationship between modern architecture and the Alpine environment.

Since 2000 the complex has been owned by the private company Minoter. Since 2014, the site has been the subject of cultural regeneration activities through the project "ProgettoBorca", aimed at preserving and reinterpreting the architectural heritage of the settlement.

== Sources ==
- Achleitner, Friedrich; Biadene, Paolo; Gellner, Edoardo; Merlo, Michele (2002). Edoardo Gellner. Corte di Cadore (in Italian). Milan: Skira.
- D'Incà Levis, Gianluca (2015). "Il villaggio abitato". Il calendario del popolo: architettura industriale, luoghi per l'arte e la cultura (in Italian). 767. Rome: 27–29.
- Fois, Valeria; Merlo, Michele (2004). Edoardo Gellner. Percepire il paesaggio – Living Landscape (in Italian). Milan: Skira. pp. 187–189.
- Gellner, Edoardo (1960). "Corte di Cadore: il villaggio sociale dell'ENI". Urbanistica (in Italian). 32. Rome: 40–57.
- Romagnoli, Emiliano (2017). "Costruire la montagna". Officina (in Italian). 22. Treviso: 22–27.
- Severati, Carlo; Merlo, Michele (2006). Edoardo Gellner: architetture organiche per Enrico Mattei, 1954-1961: atti della giornata di studi, Roma, Gela, Pieve di Cadore, Sala Herzog, Facoltà di architettura, Roma Tre, 17 marzo 2005 (in Italian). Rome: Gangemi Editore.
