= Svit =

- Municipality
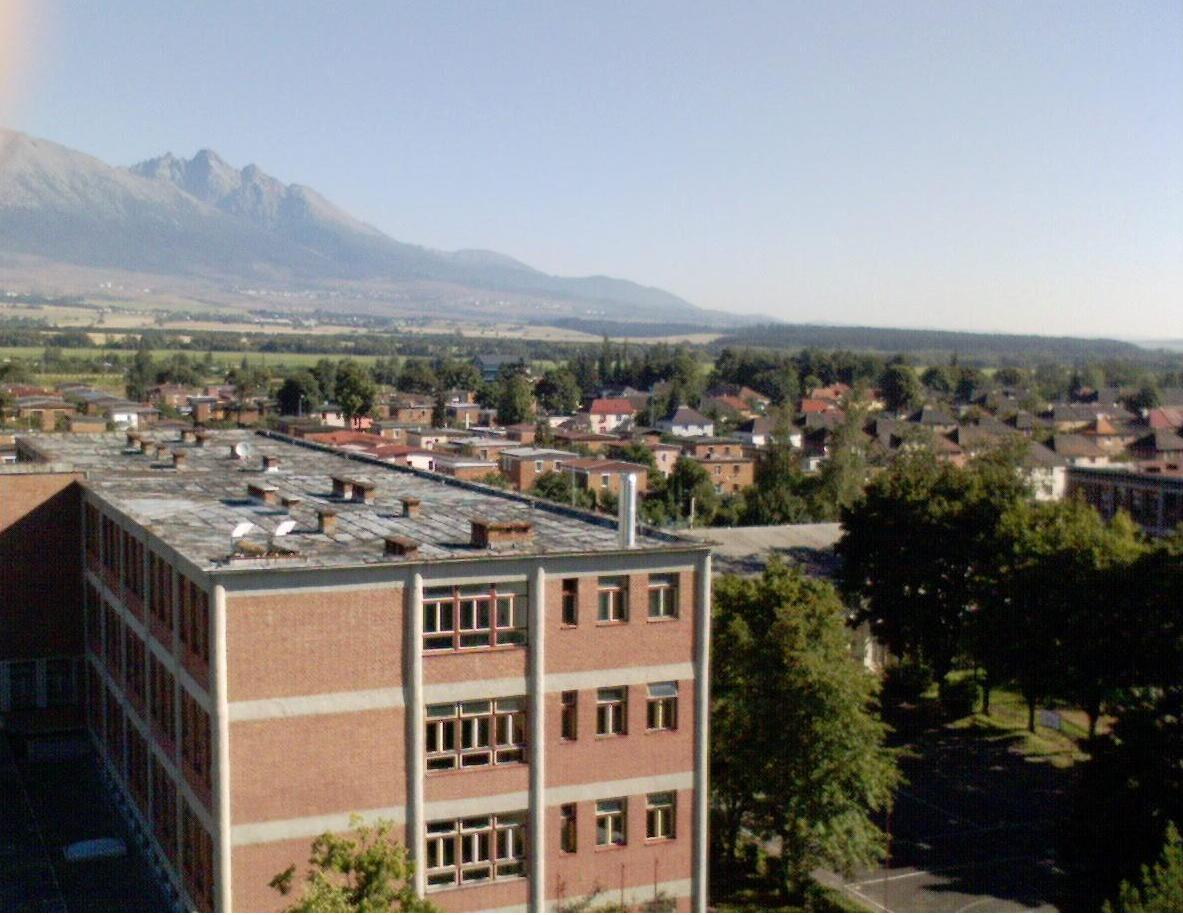
- General view of the town

- Flag Coat of arms

- Location of Svit in the Prešov Region Location of Svit in Slovakia
- Coordinates: 49.07°N 20.19°E
- Country: Slovakia
- Region: Prešov Region
- District: Poprad District
- First mentioned: 1946

Government
  - Mayor: Ing. Dáša Vojsovičová

Area
  - Total: 4.50 km^{2} (1.74 sq mi)
- Elevation: 720 m (2,360 ft)

Population (2025)
  - Total: 7,642
- Time zone: UTC+1 (CET)
  - Summer (DST): UTC+2 (CEST)
- Postal code: 592 1
- Area code: +421 52
- Vehicle registration plate (until 2022): PP
- Website: www.svit.sk

Svit is a small town in Poprad District in the Prešov Region in northern Slovakia. It lies 8 km (5 mi) west of the city of Poprad, at the foothills of the High Tatras.

== Geography ==
The municipality lies at an altitude of 720 metres (2,360 ft) and covers an area of 4.50 km^{2} (1.74 sq mi) (2025).

== History ==
Svit is one of the youngest Slovak towns. It was established in 1934 by business industrialist Jan Antonín Baťa of Zlín, Czechoslovakia (now Czech Republic) through his organization Baťa a.s., Zlin in accordance with his policy of setting up villages around the country for his workers. As a boy, Jan Baťa saw the poverty and sickness of his fellow countrymen. He wanted to change this by creating cities full of the most modern factories and filled with the best (and happiest) workers in Europe. The Baťa System under Jan's administration brought prosperity first to Moravia, and later Slovakia and Bohemia. It was Jan's policy for full employment that drove him to create each Baťa town for a different purpose: Shoes, Rubber and Tires, Textiles, Airplanes, Chemicals, Plastics, Media, Stockings, Leather, and Machinery.

When the World War II came, Jan Baťa's policy was to secretly fund the Czechoslovak government-in-exile, to supply the Czech Army with shoes and clothing and to secretly fund the Slovak National Uprising that started at Baťovany (now Partizánske) on 29 August 1944. Jan Baťa represented Czech/Slovak freedom and prosperity.

Svit is short for "Slovenské vizkózové továrne" (in English Slovak Viscose Works). Also, the word svit means 'shine' in Slovak and Ukrainian (related to Slovak úsvit, 'dawn'). Svit is the smallest town in Slovakia (4.5 km²) in terms of area, with a population of 7,790.

== Population ==
Historical population
Year	Pop.	±%
1970	7,291	—
1980	8,048	+10.4%
1991	7,485	−7.0%
2001	7,445	−0.5%
2011	7,608	+2.2%
2021	7,743	+1.8%
Source: Censuses

Population statistic (10 years)
Year	1995	2005	2015	2025
Count	7563	7510	7771	7642
Difference		−0.70%	+3.47%	−1.66%

Population statistic
Year	2024	2025
Count	7717	7642
Difference		−0.97%

It has a population of 7642 people (31 December 2025).

=== Ethnicity ===
Census 2021 (1+ %)
Ethnicity	Number	Fraction
Slovak	7276	93.96%
Not found out	390	5.03%
Romani	92	1.18%
Total	7743	

In year 2021 was 7743 people by ethnicity 7276 as Slovak, 390 as Not found out, 92 as Romani, 68 as Rusyn, 67 as Czech, 42 as Other, 24 as Russian, 23 as Hungarian, 19 as Polish, 12 as Ukrainian, 6 as Romanian, 5 as German, 5 as English, 3 as Jewish, 2 as Italian, 1 as Irish, 1 as Serbian, 1 as Silesian, 1 as Austrian and 1 as Bulgarian.

Note on population: The difference values of population numbers in the table "Population statistic" and in the sections "Ethnicity" & "Religion" is caused by the use of various statistical methods.

=== Religion ===
Census 2021 (1+ %)
Religion	Number	Fraction
Roman Catholic Church	4018	51.89%
None	2218	28.65%
Evangelical Church	539	6.96%
Not found out	479	6.19%
Greek Catholic Church	287	3.71%
Total	7743	

In year 2021 was 7743 people by religion 4018 from Roman Catholic Church, 2218 from None, 539 from Evangelical Church, 479 from Not found out, 287 from Greek Catholic Church, 31 from Eastern Orthodox Church, 28 from Ad hoc movements, 25 from Christian Congregations in Slovakia, 22 from Other and not ascertained christian church, 21 from Other, 18 from Paganism and natural spirituality, 17 from Baptists Church, 10 from Buddhism, 10 from Apostolic Church, 8 from Calvinist Church, 5 from Seventh-day Adventist Church, 3 from Islam, 1 from Old Catholic Church, 1 from Jehovah's Witnesses, 1 from United Methodist Church and 1 from Czechoslovak Hussite Church.

== Churches ==
- Roman Catholic Church of St. Joseph
- Roman Catholic Church of St. Cyril and Methodius
- Greek Catholic Chapel of St. Cyril and Methodius
- Lutheran Church

== Sports ==
The town is home to the professional basketball team BK Iskra Svit, which plays in the Slovak Extraliga.

== Twin towns — sister cities ==
Svit is twinned with:

- Česká Třebová, Czech Republic
- Knurów, Poland
- Partizánske, Slovakia
- San Lorenzo in Campo, Italy

== See also ==
- List of company towns
