= Ondrej Vrábel (philanthropist) =

Slovak philanthropist (born 2001)

Ondrej Vrábel (born 19 October 2001) is a Slovak philanthropist, programmer, co-founder of civic association Mladí and entrepreneur who is known for his software for children with special needs and disabilities.

== Biography ==
Ondrej Vrábel grew up in Záhorí. His mother's cousin had a cerebral palsy, which has been his motivation for developing learning tools for people with special needs. He learned to code through tutorials on the Web.

In 2016, Vrábel was awarded Crystal Wing Award in Philanthropy for his free software for children with special needs - Pinf Hry (Pinf Games) - and became the youngest recipient of this award (14 years old). Later in 2018, he was listed as one of Forbes 30 Under 30 in Slovakia for his activities.

Joining Marek Mach, they established civic association Mladí, which currently runs various charitable projects, including Dúhy.sk (Slovak social network for queer people), Youth Against Fascism (Mladí proti fašizmu), Youth For Climate (Mladí za klímu) and Youth News (Správy Mladí).

His goal is to keep Pinf Hry free for all.
