= Borca di Cadore =

- Comune
- Comune di Borca di Cadore
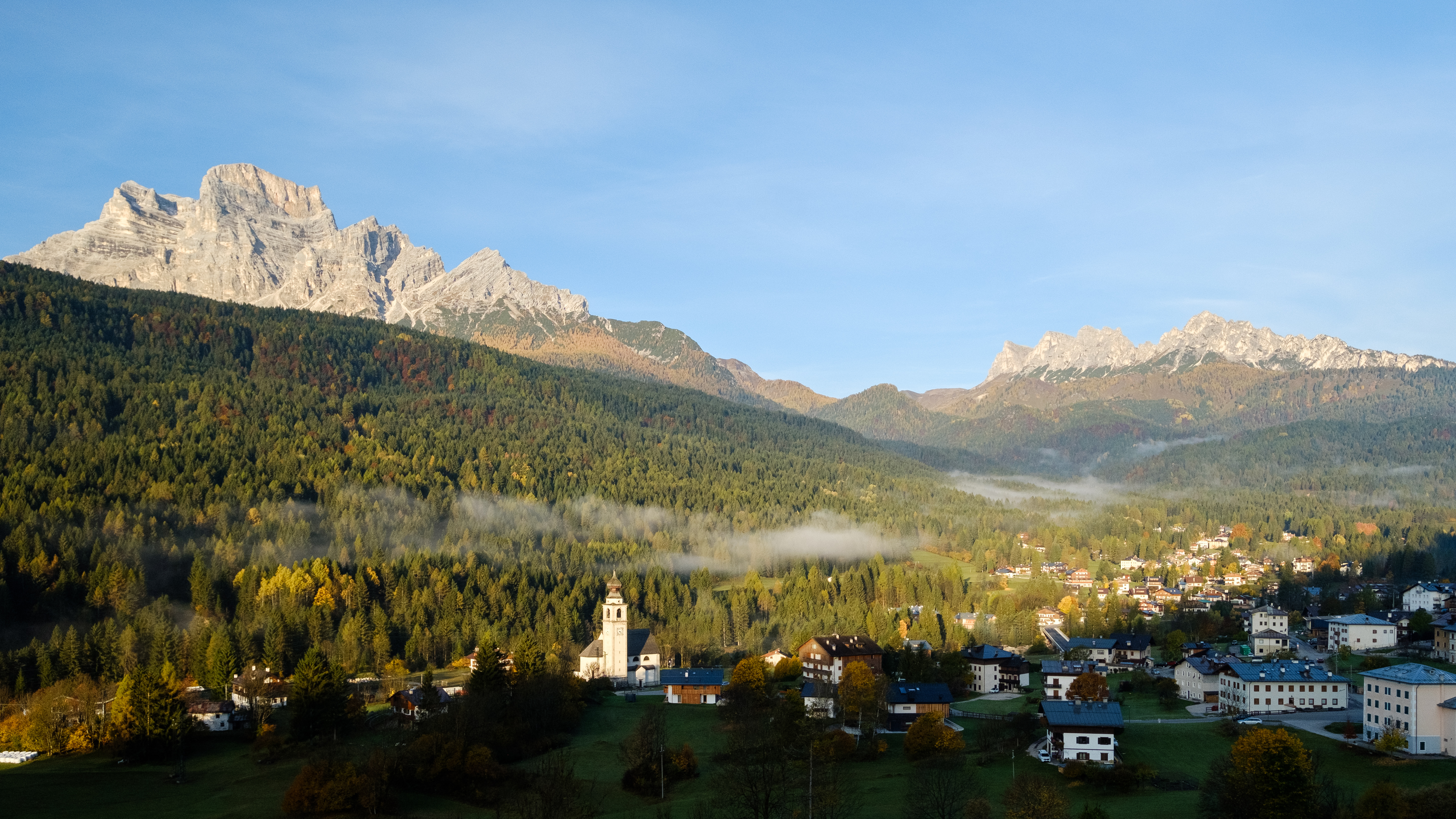
- Borca di Cadore with Monte Pelmo

- Location within Italy Location within Veneto
- Coordinates: 46°26′N 12°13′E
- Country: Italy
- Region: Veneto
- Province: Belluno (BL)
- Frazioni: Cancia, Corte, Villanova di Borca di Cadore

Government
  - Mayor: Bortolo Sala

Area
  - Total: 26 km^{2} (10 sq mi)
- Elevation: 945 m (3,100 ft)

Population (28 February 2007)
  - Total: 774
  - Density: 30/km^{2} (77/sq mi)
- Demonym: Borcesi
- Time zone: UTC+1 (CET)
  - Summer (DST): UTC+2 (CEST)
- Postal code: 32040
- Dialing code: 0435
- ISTAT code: 025007
- Patron saint: Saint Simon
- Saint day: 28 October
- Website: http://www.comune.borcadicadore.bl.it/

Borca di Cadore is a comune (municipality) in the province of Belluno in the Italian region of Veneto, located about 110 kilometres (68 mi) north of Venice and about 35 kilometres (22 mi) north of Belluno.

== Climate ==
Climate data for Borca di Cadore, elevation 953 m (3,127 ft), (1991–2020)
Month	Jan	Feb	Mar	Apr	May	Jun	Jul	Aug	Sep	Oct	Nov	Dec	Year
Mean daily maximum °C (°F)	3.9 (39.0)	5.6 (42.1)	9.9 (49.8)	13.6 (56.5)	18.1 (64.6)	22.0 (71.6)	24.2 (75.6)	23.6 (74.5)	18.8 (65.8)	13.7 (56.7)	7.7 (45.9)	3.9 (39.0)	13.8 (56.8)
Daily mean °C (°F)	−1.2 (29.8)	0.1 (32.2)	3.7 (38.7)	7.3 (45.1)	11.7 (53.1)	15.4 (59.7)	17.4 (63.3)	17.0 (62.6)	12.7 (54.9)	8.4 (47.1)	3.3 (37.9)	−0.7 (30.7)	7.9 (46.3)
Mean daily minimum °C (°F)	−5.3 (22.5)	−4.9 (23.2)	−2.2 (28.0)	1.2 (34.2)	5.3 (41.5)	8.6 (47.5)	10.3 (50.5)	10.4 (50.7)	6.8 (44.2)	3.3 (37.9)	−0.7 (30.7)	−4.3 (24.3)	2.4 (36.3)
Average precipitation mm (inches)	46.2 (1.82)	34.5 (1.36)	61.0 (2.40)	81.0 (3.19)	113.1 (4.45)	111.5 (4.39)	121.5 (4.78)	131.4 (5.17)	107.9 (4.25)	134.2 (5.28)	133.5 (5.26)	66.2 (2.61)	1,142 (44.96)
Average precipitation days (≥ 1.0 mm)	4.8	5.0	6.6	10.0	13.1	13.3	12.9	12.7	9.6	8.4	8.4	5.7	110.5
Source: Istituto Superiore per la Protezione e la Ricerca Ambientale
