= Bata =

Bata, Baťa, Baţa or Batá may refer to:

== Organizations ==
- Bata Corporation, a multinational corporation
- Bata Shoe Museum, a museum of the history of footwear in Toronto

== Places ==
- Bata, Burgas Province, a village in the municipality of Pomorie, Bulgaria
- Bata, Pazardzhik Province, a village in the municipality of Panagyurishte, Bulgaria
- Bata, Egypt, a village in Qalyubia Governorate
- Baťa Canal, a canal in the Czech Republic
- Bata, Equatorial Guinea, the largest city in Equatorial Guinea
  - Bata Airport, an airport in Equatorial Guinea
- Báta, a village in Hungary
- Bata, Cetinje, a village in the municipality of Cetinje, Montenegro
- Bata, Arad, a commune in Arad County, Romania
- Bața, a village in Petru Rareş Commune, Bistrița-Năsăud County, Romania
- Bata Chowk metro station, Delhi, India
- Bata, the Greek and Genoese colony in Russia that became Novorossiysk
- Batadorp, a former village, now neighborhood of Best, in the Netherlands

== Other uses ==
- Bata (god), an Egyptian bull-god of the New Kingdom
- Bata (martial arts), various forms of stick fighting in Irish martial arts
- Bata (name), a given name and a surname (includes a list of people with the name)
- Batá drum, a double-headed Yoruba drum
- Bata language, an Afro-Asiatic language spoken in Nigeria and Cameroon
- Bata people, people of North Province, Cameroon
- Bata, the cyprinid fish Labeo bata
- 4318 Baťa, an asteroid

== See also ==
- Bay Area Toll Authority
- Beta (disambiguation)
