= Thomas Bata =

Thomas Bata may refer to:

- Tomáš Baťa (1876–1932), founder of Bata Shoes
- Thomas J. Bata (1914–2008), Tomáš's son who led the corporation through the 1980s
- Thomas G. Bata (born 1948), Tomáš's grandson who currently leads Bata Shoes

== See also ==
- Tomas Bata University in Zlín, Czech Republic
- Club Deportivo Thomas Bata, Chile
