= Bata (name) =

Bata is both a given name and a surname. Notable people with the name include:

== Given name ==
- Bata LoBagola (1877–1947), early 20th-century American impostor and entertainer

== Nickname ==
- Agustín Sauto Arana (1908–1986), Spanish footballer
- Branko "Bato" Bulatović (1951–2004), Montenegrin football administrator
- Bata Paskaljević (1923–2004), Serbian actor
- Bahrudin "Bato" Čengić (1931–2007), Bosnian film director
- Bata Živojinović (1933–2016), Serbian actor and politician
- Danilo "Bata" Stojković (1934–2002), Serbian actor
- Bratislav "Bata" Đorđević (born 1938), Serbian basketball coach
- Bata Kameni (1941–2017), Serbian actor and stunt performer
- Kornelije "Bata" Kovač (1942–2022), Serbian composer
- Milovan "Bata Đora" Đorić (born 1945), Serbian football coach
- Mladen "Bata" Vranešević (1947–2006), Serbian rock musician
- Efren Reyes (born 1954), Filipino pool player
- Zoran "Bata" Mirković (born 1971), Serbian footballer

== Surname ==
- István Bata (1910–1982), Hungarian military officer and politician
- Sonja Bata (1926–2018), Canadian businesswoman
- Tomáš Baťa (1876–1932), Czech shoe company founder
  - Jan Antonín Baťa (1898–1965), half-brother of the founder
  - Thomas J. Bata (1914–2008), son of the founder
