= Sonja Bata =

Canadian businesswoman (1926–2018)

Sonja Bata OC MSM CD
- Born: Sonja Ingrid Wettstein; 8 November 1926; Zürich, Switzerland
- Died: 20 February 2018 (aged 91); Toronto, Ontario, Canada
- Burial place: Mount Pleasant Cemetery
- Other name: Sonja Baťová
- Occupations: Businesswoman, philanthropist, collector and museum founder
- Spouse: Thomas J. Bata (m. 1946; died 2008)
- Children: 4
- Relatives: Tomáš Baťa (father-in-law)

Sonja Ingrid Bata OC MSM CD (or Sonja Baťová; née Wettstein; 8 November 1926 – 20 February 2018) was a Swiss and Canadian socialite, philanthropist, collector and museum founder. She had briefly studied architecture prior to her marriage in 1946.

== Biography ==
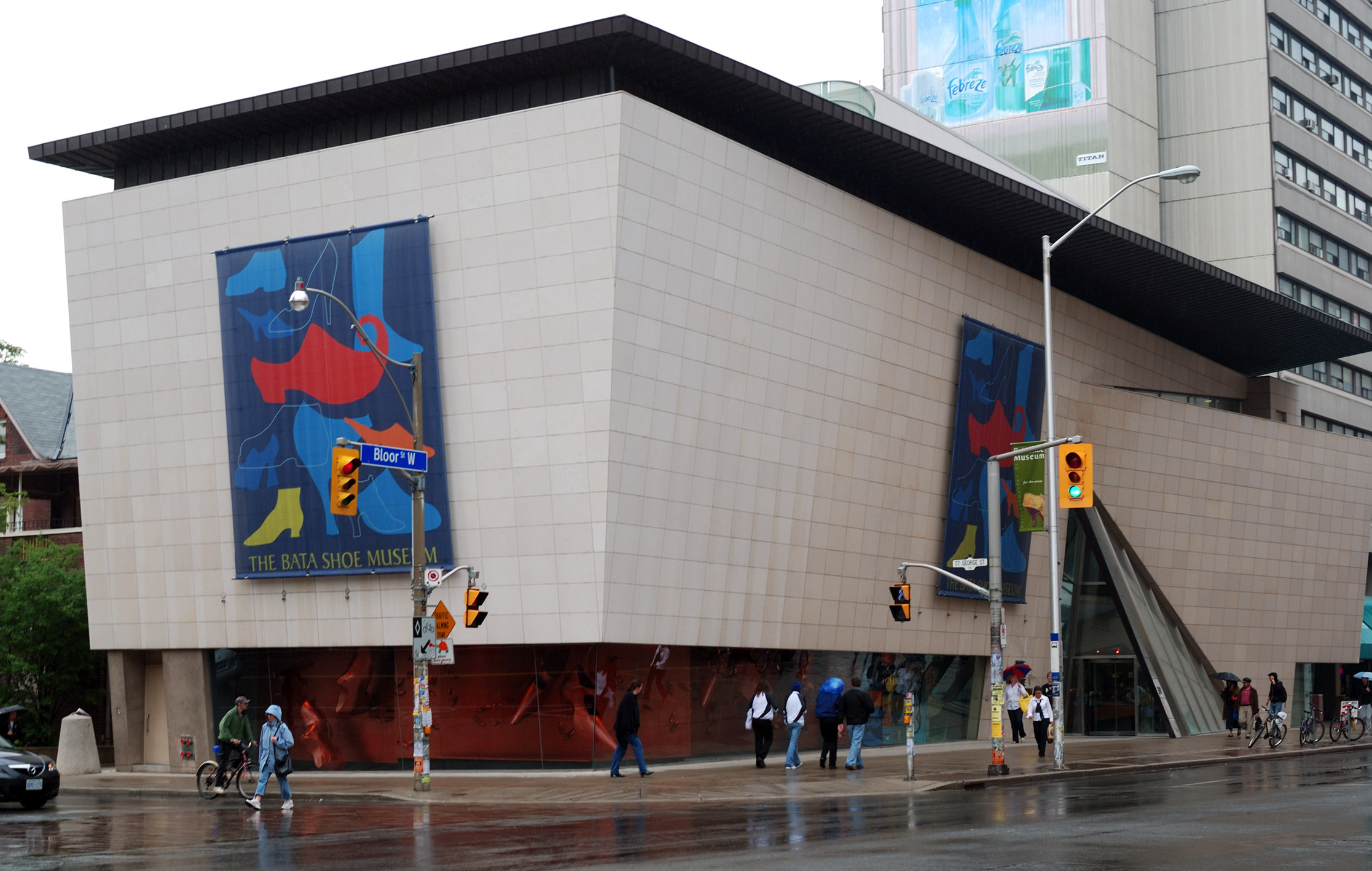
Bata Shoe Museum

She left her architecture studies after her marriage to Thomas J. Bata of Bata Shoes. In 1946 she moved to Toronto, where she befriended local architects. Among them were Raymond Moriyama, who later designed the Bata Shoe Museum, and John Cresswell Parkin, who designed the Don Mills headquarters of Bata Shoes and the family's country house in Batawa. Though she had earlier envisioned herself to become an architect, she set her designs on improving the Bata Shoe company.

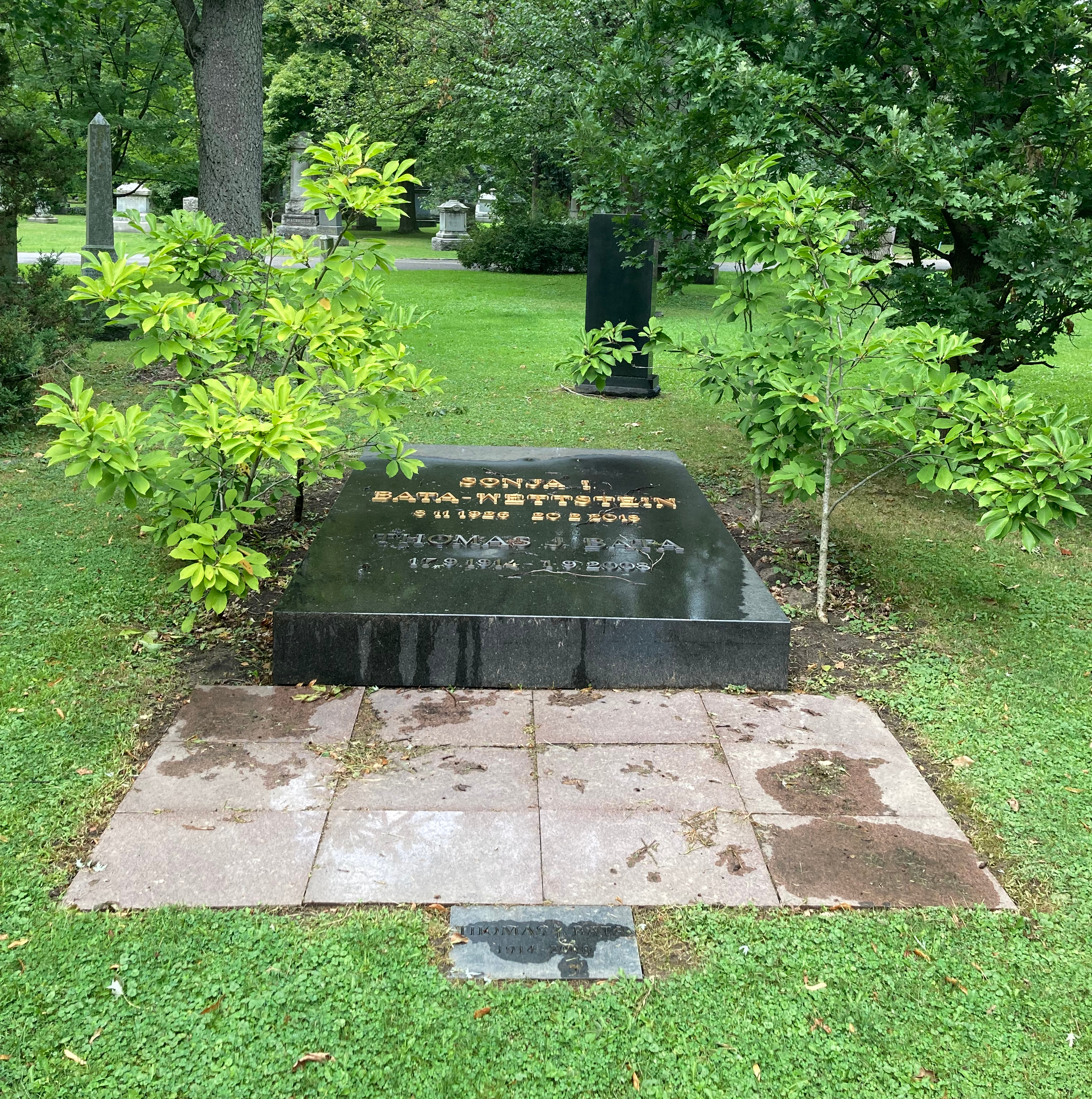
Graves of Sonja and Thomas Bata at Mount Pleasant Cemetery

Also in the 1940s, she began collecting shoes and studying their history. In 1979, she endowed the Bata Shoe Museum Foundation. The Bata Shoe Museum, established in 1995, is the world's largest shoe museum, and the core collection is attributed to Bata. She was the museum's chairperson.

Bata was also the chair of the National Design Council (1970s). She helped establish the Toronto French School, served as director the Art Gallery of Ontario, sat on the boards of Alcan and Canada Trustco (now TD Canada Trust), affiliated with the World Wildlife Fund, and became an Honorary Captain in the RCN and sponsor of HMCS Ottawa.

She was appointed an Officer of the Order of Canada in 1983. She died at her home in Toronto on 20 February 2018, outliving her husband for nine years. She was buried alongside him at Mount Pleasant Cemetery.

== Personal life ==
She had four children. Her father-in-law is Tomáš Baťa, the founder of Bata Shoes.

== Awards ==
- Appointed an Officer of the Order of Canada (OC) in 1983.
- As an Officer of the Order, she automatically received the 125th Anniversary of the Confederation of Canada Medal in 1992.
- She automatically received the Canadian Version of the Queen Elizabeth II Golden Jubilee Medal in 2002.
- She automatically received the Canadian Version of the Queen Elizabeth II Diamond Jubilee Medal in 2012.
- She received the Meritorious Service Medal (MSM) in the Military Division on 19 February 2007.
- She received the Canadian Forces' Decoration (CD) with 1 Clasp for her time as an Honorary Captain with the Royal Canadian Navy 1989-2013.
- Companion of the Canadian Business Hall of Fame
- Lifetime achievement award, Retail Council of Canada
- 1995, Conference Board of Canada

== Bibliography ==
- Bata, Thomas John; Sinclair, Sonja (1990). Bata: Shoemaker to the World. Bata. ISBN 978-0-7737-2416-7.
- Benstock, Shari; Ferriss, Suzanne (2001). Footnotes: On Shoes. Rutgers University Press. ISBN 978-0-8135-2871-7.
- DeMello, Margo (10 September 2009). Feet and Footwear: A Cultural Encyclopedia. ABC-CLIO. ISBN 978-0-313-35715-2.
- Grzeskowiak, Mark (16 April 2008). Toronto & Niagara Colourguide. Formac Publishing Company Limited. ISBN 978-0-88780-760-2.
- Rezac, Darcy (2005). Work the Pond: Use the Power of Positive Networking to Leap Forward in Work and Life. Prentice Hall Press. ISBN 978-0-7352-0402-7.
