= Calceology =

Study of footwear

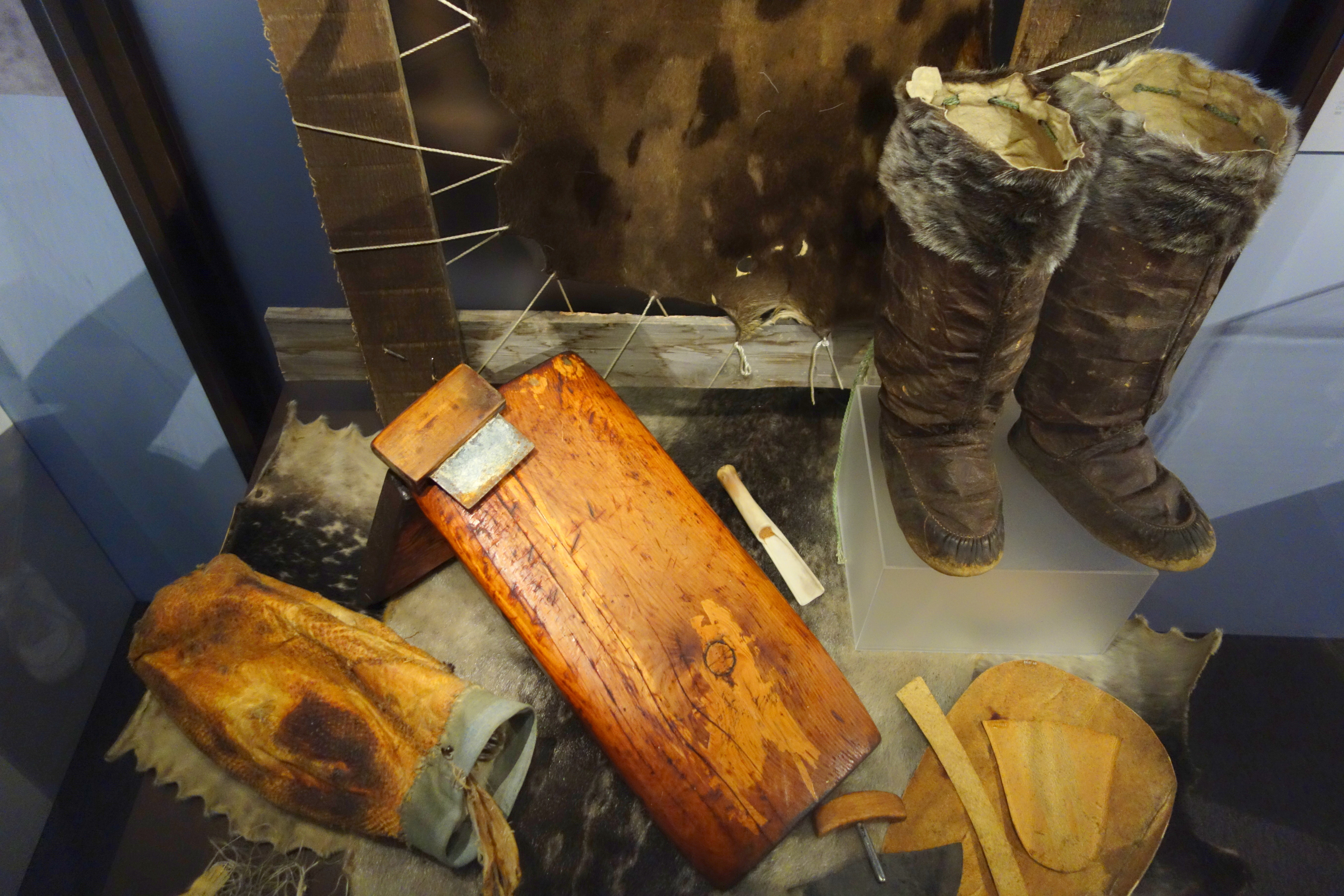
Inuit boots and shoe-making tools on display at the Bata Shoe Museum, a museum of calceology in Canada

Calceology (from Latin calcei "shoes" and -λογία, -logiā, "-logy") is the study of footwear, especially historical footwear whether as archaeology, shoe fashion history, or otherwise. It is not yet formally recognized as a field of research. Calceology comprises the examination, registration, research and conservation of leather shoe fragments. A wider definition includes the general study of the ancient footwear, its social and cultural history, technical aspects of pre-industrial shoemaking and associated leather trades, as well as reconstruction of archaeological footwear.

== History of calceology ==
Among the early studies of footwear from European archaeological excavations, Roman period footwear figures prominently, followed by medieval period finds. Scientifically based research was first applied to Roman period finds and later for prehistoric and primitive footwear. With the development of the Goubitz notation system, the technical aspects of the recovered shoe fragments could be clearly presented, allowing researchers a coherent scientific base for leather artifact documentation and correct interpretation. The interest in the history of ancient shoe fashion starts in the 17th century. The interpretation of historical socio-cultural attributes shows the importance of footwear in an archaeological context. The reference book for calceological studies covers the chronological span from European prehistory (Neolithic, Bronze and Iron Ages), Roman period, the Middle Ages to the 19th century. Calceological studies outside of Europe address post-1600 sites on the east coast and bays of North America, and the North African sites associated with the Egyptian, Roman and Coptic periods.

== Methods ==
=== Preservation ===
Archaeological leather artifacts are preserved in stable environments, either in constantly humid, dry or frozen sites. Peat bogs also preserve leather and skin artifacts, but through a re-tanning process. Water-logged archaeological sites provide the necessary conditions for the preservation of vegetable tanned leather. As an organic material, water-logged archaeological leather needs to be stabilized by an appropriate conservation method. Dry conditions may be found in deserts and at high altitudes but also within the walls of medieval and later period buildings where leather shoes were concealed for superstitious reasons. Ice fields, tundra and glaciers can occasionally preserve ancient leather artifacts through constant freezing.

== Examination of archaeological shoe finds ==
Water-logged finds generally consist of loose components since the threads used to sew the objects together does not survive humid burial. A tracking system should be used for keeping the loose components in order throughout the analysis and conservation processes. For wet archaeological leather, the first step is cleaning gently in water with a small soft brush. Conservation is preferably performed after the documentation phase. Documentation consists of drawings and written notes, photographic records are less useful since blackish leather does not show fine detail well. The first step for the Goubitz notation registration is an exact tracing of the fragment’s outline, usually positioned grain side down, flesh side up. Then symbols that indicate the type of stitches and seams are drawn in their appropriate place inside the outline. Sole constructions (the way in which the upper parts of the shoe is fixed to the sole), fastening method and ensembles of components from the same shoe as well as animal type, leather thickness, folds and creases are usually checked. If present, decoration type and technique used are also recorded.

Most archaeological recovered leather artifacts are parts of footwear and may be combined with wood, fibre or metal parts. The technical details such as shoe construction technique, fastening method and fashion elements are used to establish a typology for a specific find group. Shoe type indicates the kinds of footwear such as boots, shoes, pattens, overshoes, etcetera. Shoe style is the consistent combination of a fastening method, height, fashion and decoration elements on a significant quantity of recovered shoes. Style nomenclature based on find place's name has been partly established for Roman period finds. Due to changes in fashion and the fact that shoes have a limited life span due to use, footwear is a chronologically sensitive material excavation and represents a closely dated chronological source for archeology. The find context, stratigraphic placement and other dating methods contribute to establishing a specific chronology. Further research for comparative parallel examples among the existing archaeological archives (collections, publications, reports) helps to define a relative chronology for the shoe types and styles.

== See also ==
- List of shoe styles
- Taphonomy
- Anthropology
- Paleontology
- Bata Shoe Museum
