= Batawa Ski Hill =

Ski area in Quinte West, Ontario, Canada

- Interactive map of Batawa Ski Hill
- Location: Ontario, Canada
- Nearest major city: Trenton
- Coordinates: 44°10′00″N 77°35′48″W
- Vertical: 50 m (164 ft)
- Trails: 7
- Longest run: 762 m (2,500 ft)
- Lift system: 3 lifts
- Snowfall: 76 cm (30 in)
- Snowmaking: 75%
- Website: batawaskihill.com

Batawa Ski Hill is a ski area in the municipality of Quinte West in eastern Ontario, Canada, that was established in 1959 by employees of Bata Shoes just outside the community of Batawa. The area offers lighted night skiing, a terrain park, and snowshoeing. The ski hill operates one quad Chairlift and one T-Bar.

== See also ==
- List of ski areas and resorts in Canada
