= Thomas J. Bata =

Canadian businessman (1914–2008)

Thomas J. Bata CC
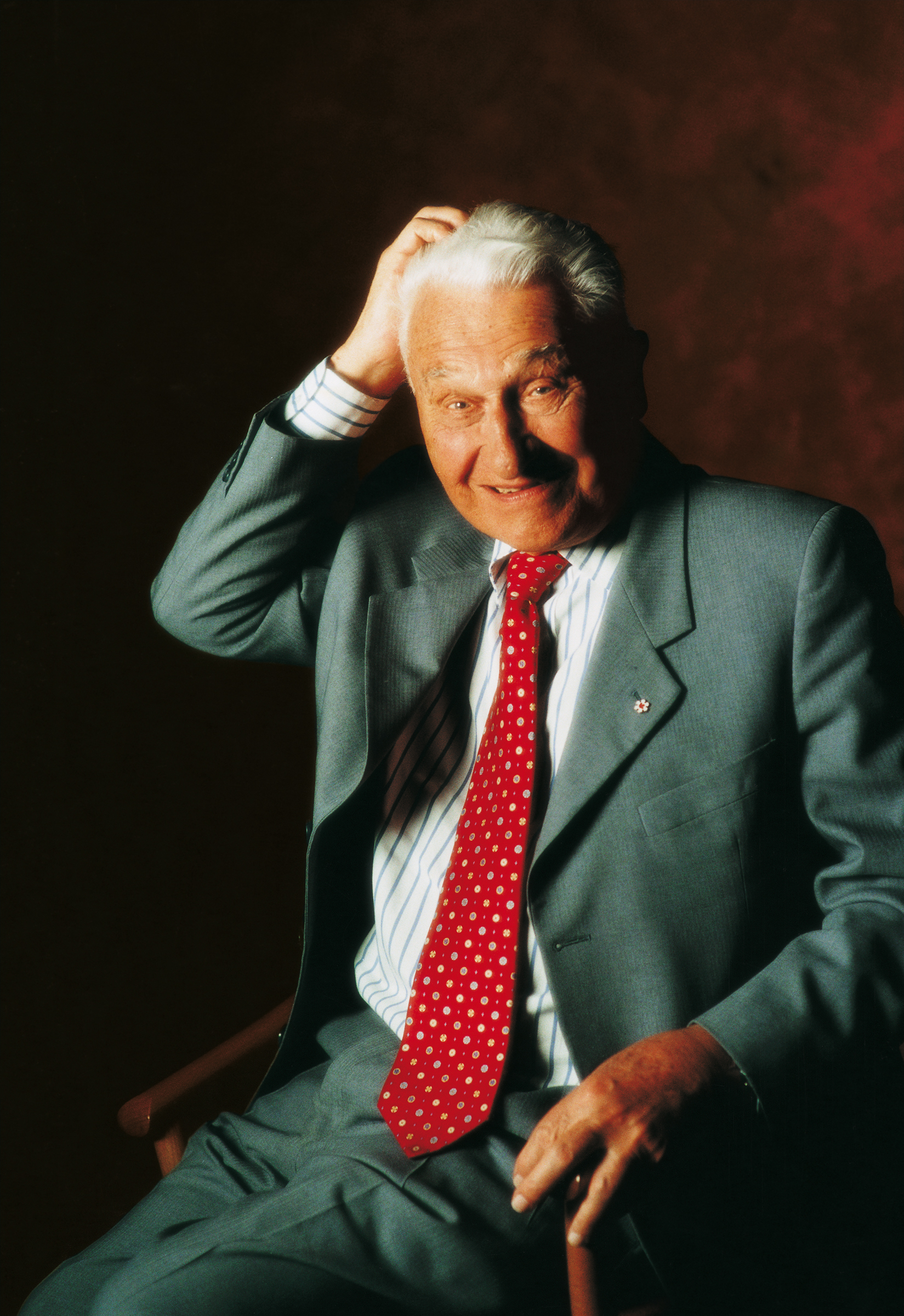
- Baťa in December 1989
- Born: Tomáš Jan Baťa; September 17, 1914; Prague, Bohemia, Austria-Hungary
- Died: September 1, 2008 (aged 93); Toronto, Ontario, Canada
- Burial place: Mount Pleasant Cemetery
- Occupations: Businessman and philanthropist
- Spouse: Sonja Wettstein (m. 1946)
- Children: 4
- Parent(s): Tomáš Baťa; Marie Menčíková

Tomáš Jan Baťa, CC (Czech pronunciation: [ˈtomaːʃ jan ˈbaca]; anglicised to Thomas J. Bata; September 17, 1914 – September 1, 2008), also known as Thomas Bata Jr. and Tomáš Baťa ml., was a Czech and Canadian businessman and philanthropist. He ran the Bata Shoe Company from the 1940s until the 80s.

== Life and career ==
Baťa was born in the city of Prague, in what is now the Czech Republic, the son of Czech industrialist Tomáš Baťa. As a boy he apprenticed under his father, who began the T. & A. Bata Shoe Company in 1894 in Zlín (now in the Czech Republic). Baťa's father, however, was killed in a plane crash in 1932, when young Baťa was only 17.

One of the reasons for Tomáš Baťa's success was his vision to introduce new technologies to his company, taking production to massive levels worldwide. Another factor was World War I, which ended the market that the company had under the Austro-Hungarian Empire. So between the 1920s and 1940s, Bata built factories in Asia, South America and Africa (which he foresaw as a virgin market), thus becoming the largest shoemaker in the world. In the 1960s and 1970s, the Bata white canvas sneaker/running shoe was iconic in the third world, representing between 60% and 80% of the shoe production in the countries where it operated. In Asia and South America, the company focused on everyday affordable shoe production, leaving for Europe the high-quality, high-price shoes.

In the mid-1930s, Bata successfully pursued a large contact to provide boots for the military forces of Mussolini, thereby directly assisting fascism but also garnering profits for his company.

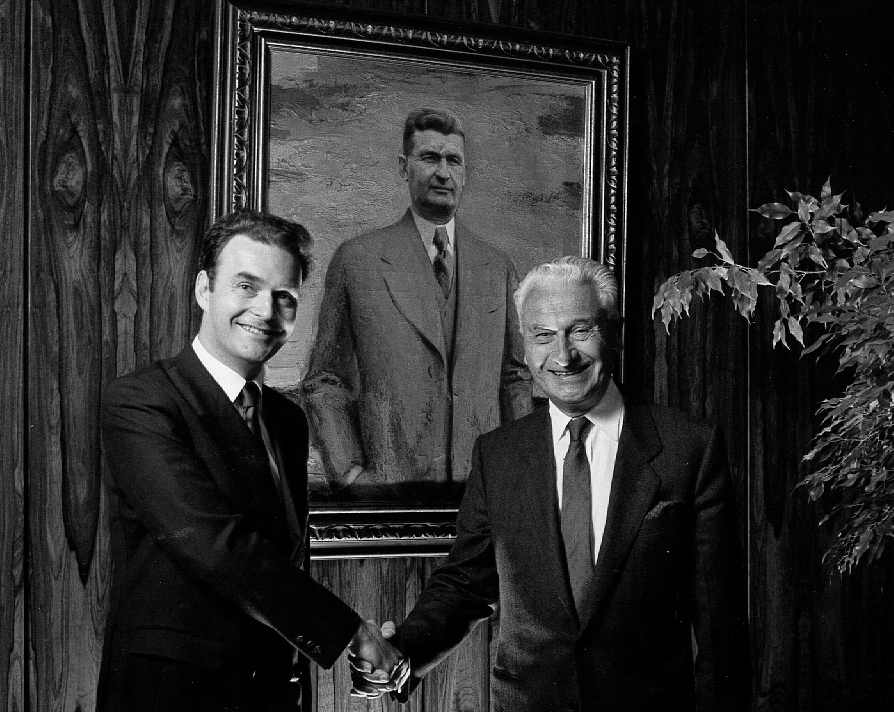
Baťa and his son in front of a portrait of Tomáš Baťa

Tomáš Baťa attended school in Czechoslovakia, England and Switzerland. Anticipating the Second World War, he, together with over 100 families from Czechoslovakia, fled to Canada in 1939 to develop the Bata Shoe Company of Canada, including a shoe factory and engineering plant, centred in a town that still bears his name, Batawa, Ontario. Another legacy is Batanagar in Kolkata, India, which originally housed the shoe factory and the clerical employees, and today is a booming condominium development maintaining the name.

Baťa successfully established and ran the new Canadian operations and during the war years, he sought to maintain the necessary coordination with as many of the overseas Bata operations as was possible. During this period, the Canadian engineering plant manufactured strategic components for the Allies.

In 1945, it was clear that Zlín was lost and could no longer act as headquarters. Baťa held a meeting in East Tilbury near London, and the decision was taken that Bata Development Limited in England would become the service headquarters of the Bata Shoe Organization.

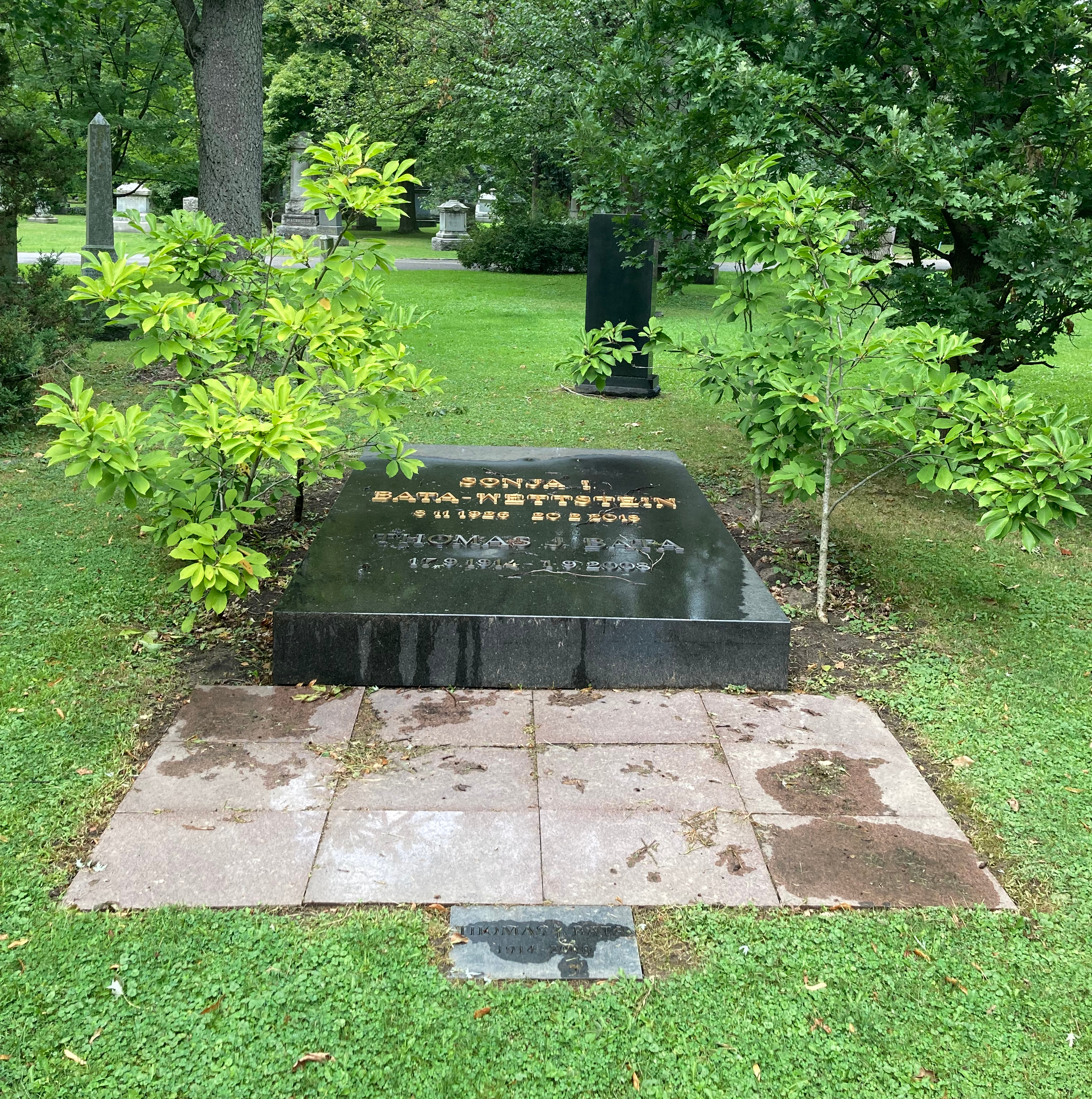
Graves of Sonja and Thomas Bata at Mount Pleasant Cemetery

The Bata Shoe Organization then expanded around the world. Bata moved the headquarters of the organization to Toronto in 1964, and in 1965 an ultramodern building, the Bata International Centre, was opened.

Baťa led the organization until 1984, when his son Thomas George Bata became the CEO.

By 2000, the Bata company was struggling in Canada. In 2000, the original Batawa factory was closed. In 2001, all Bata stores in Canada were closed and the Bata Organization relocated its headquarters to Switzerland. Baťa remained in Toronto with his wife, Sonja.

Baťa died on September 1, 2008, at Sunnybrook Health Sciences Centre in Toronto, and was buried at Mount Pleasant Cemetery. A cause of death was not announced. He was survived by his wife Sonja (née Wettstein), whom he had married in 1946, their son, and three daughters.

== Legacy ==
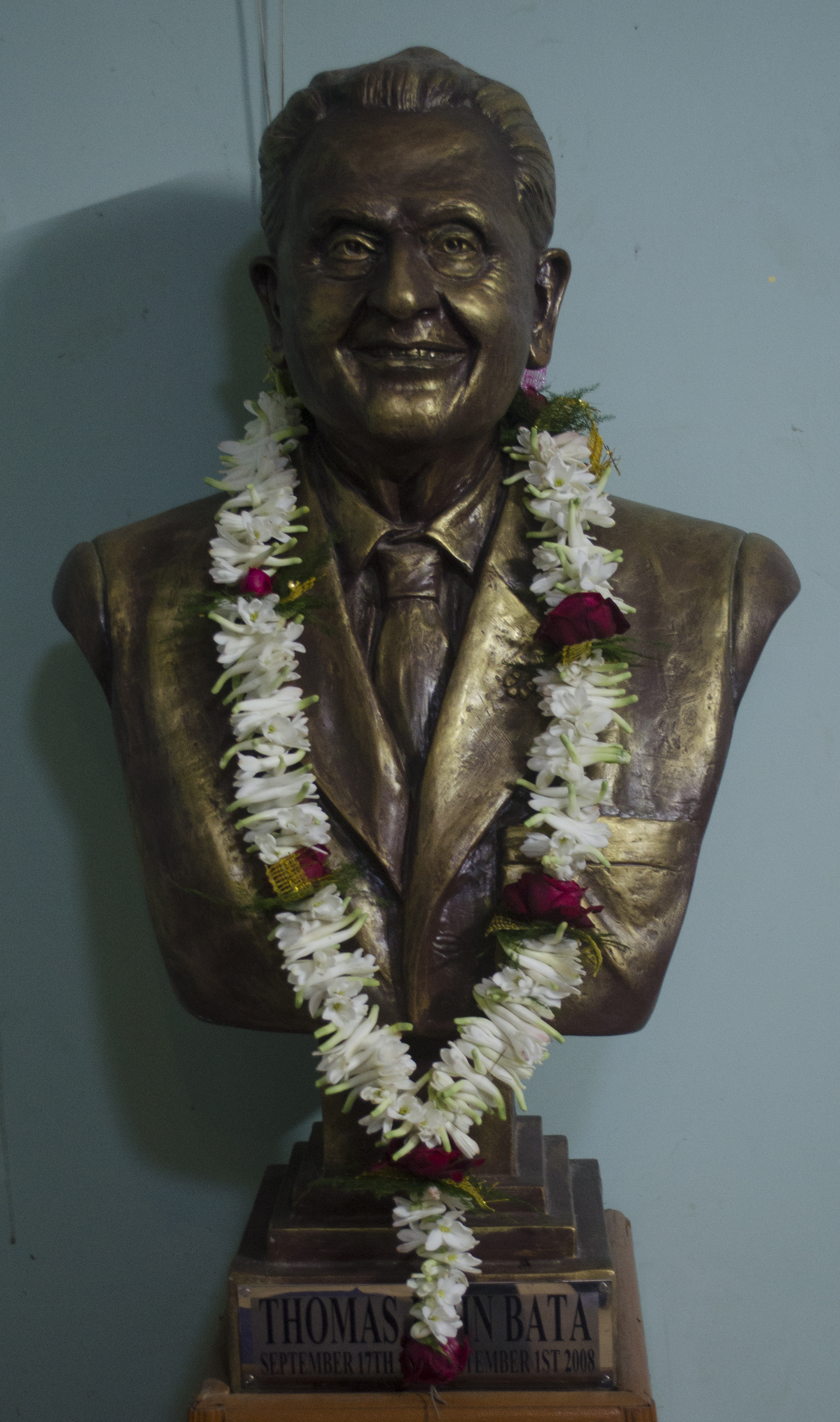
Bust of Baťa at Batanagar Sports Club in Kolkata, 2017

Baťa was invested in 1972 as a Companion of the Order of Canada, Canada's highest civilian award, and he received the Order of Tomáš Garrigue Masaryk in the Czech Republic. He was particularly proud of his association with the Hastings and Prince Edward Regiment. He joined the regiment during the Second World War, and he served as a captain in the Canadian Reserve Army and as honorary colonel from 1999 to 2007. He was frequently seen in the field visiting with its troops. In 2007, he received the FIRST Award for Responsible Capitalism, the lifetime Achievement Medal.

Baťa worked with numerous charitable organizations. He was chairman of the Bata Shoe Foundation. His dedication to Junior Achievement International, Trent University and York University in Canada and the Tomáš Baťa University in the Czech Republic reflected his interest in the education of young people.

Baťa participated in several leading business organizations. In Canada, he had been a director of Canadian Pacific Airlines and IBM Canada. He was a founding member of the Young Presidents' Organization, chairman of the Commission on Multinational Enterprises of the International Chamber of Commerce, chairman of the Business and Industry Advisory Committee to the OECD and founding member of the Canada India Business Council.

In 1969 the Bata Library was officially opened and after some reconstruction work it was re-opened in 2018.

== Awards ==
- 1972 – Invested as a Companion of the Order of Canada
- 1991 – Awarded the Czech Republic's top decoration, the Order of Tomáš Garrigue Masaryk
- 2003 – Awarded the Retail Council of Canada's Lifetime Achievement Award

== See also ==
- Bata shoe factory (East Tilbury)
- Bata Shoe Museum
- Tomas Bata Memorial (Zlín)
