= Bata Shoe Museum =

Footwear museum in Toronto, Ontario, Canada

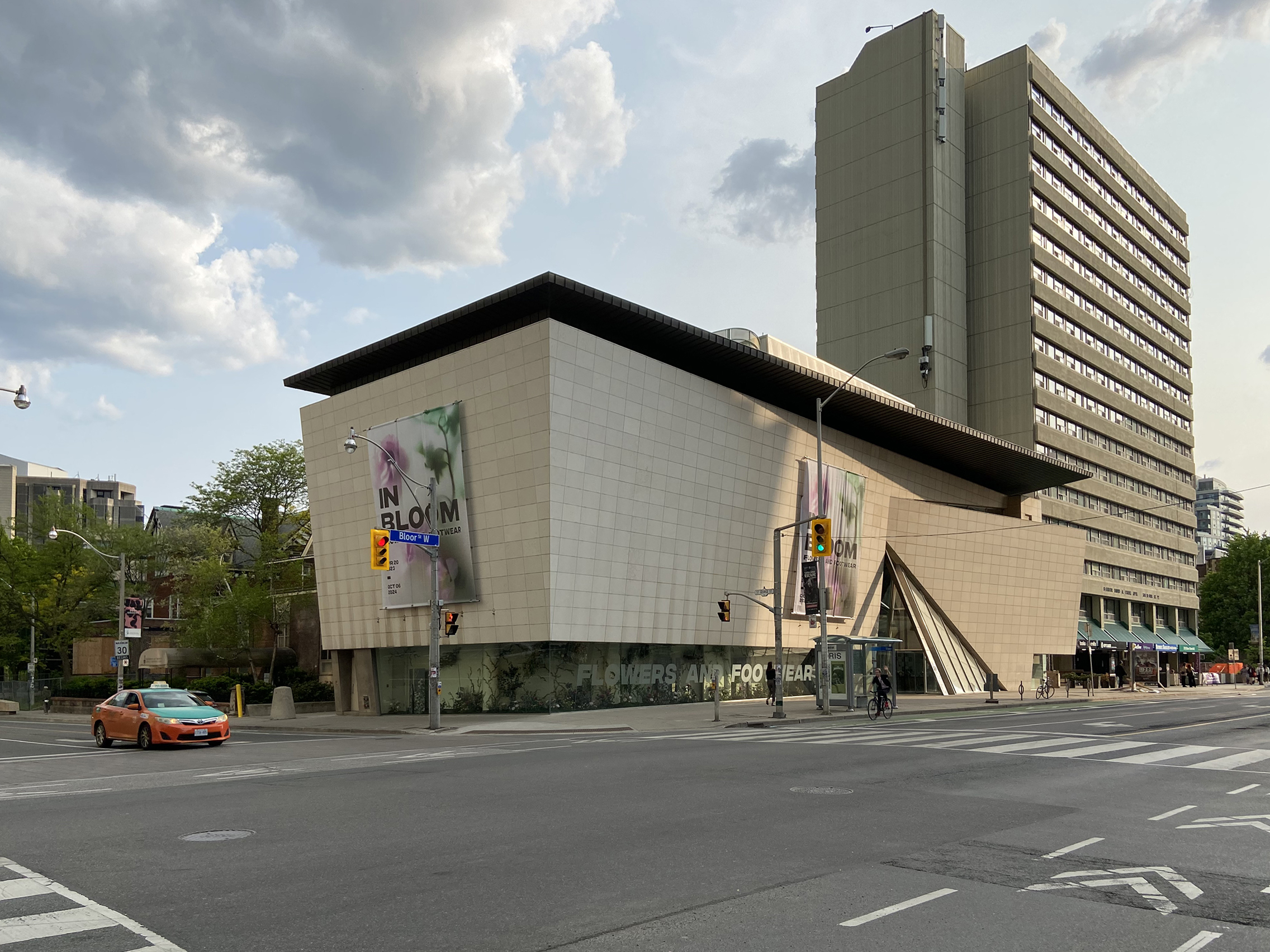
- The museum building on Bloor Street in 2023

- Location of the museum in Toronto
- Established: 1979 (Note: The following was the year the Bata Shoe Museum Foundation was officially established. A permanent facility for the museum was not opened to the public until 6 May 1995.)
- Location: 327 Bloor Street West; Toronto, Ontario, Canada
- Coordinates: 43°40′02″N 79°24′01″W
- Type: Calceology
- Visitors: 110,334 (2018)
- Founder: Sonja Bata
- Curator: Elizabeth Semmelhack
- Architect: Moriyama & Teshima Architects
- Public transit access: Spadina; St. George; 510
- Website: www.batashoemuseum.ca

The Bata Shoe Museum (BSM) is a museum of footwear and calceology in Toronto, Ontario, Canada. The museum's building is situated near the northwest of the St. George campus of the University of Toronto, in downtown Toronto. The 3,665-square-metre (39,450 sq ft) museum building was designed by Moriyama & Teshima Architects, with Raymond Moriyama as the lead architect.

The museum's collection of footwear originated from the personal collections of Sonja Bata, started in the mid-1940s. In 1979, Bata provided an endowment to create the Bata Shoe Museum Foundation, with the aim of having the collection professionally managed, and to establish a shoe museum to house, store, and exhibit the collection. The foundation exhibited the collection to the public for the first time in 1992, although it did not open a permanent facility for its museum until May 1995.

As of 2018, the museum's permanent collection includes over 13,000 shoes, and other footwear related items dating back 4,500 years; providing the museum with the largest collection of footwear in the world. Items in the museum's collection are either held in storage, or placed on display in its permanent exhibition. The museum also hosts and organizes a number of temporary and travelling exhibitions, and outreach programs.

== History ==
The museum's collection originated from the personal collections of Sonja Bata, which arose from her interest in the products produced by her husband's company, the Bata shoe company originated by Tomáš Baťa. Sonja began collecting shoes shortly after her marriage to Thomas J. Bata in 1946, and their subsequent move to Toronto. The Bata family moved to Toronto in the 1940s in order to facilitate the company's expansion into Toronto and the Americas. In 1965, the company's headquarters was formally relocated from Zlín to Toronto (the company's headquarters was later relocated to Lausanne in 2002).

By the late 1970s, the personal collection had grown to 1,500 pairs of shoes, overcrowding the company's storerooms. At the suggestion of a friend and anthropologist, Sonja Bata provided an endowment to establish the Bata Shoe Museum Foundation in 1979; an organization that would fund research into footwear and professionally manage the collection. Although the organization shared the same name as the Bata company, the foundation was established as a non-profit entity, legally separate from the Bata company. The foundation operated as a privately funded organization, as Sonja Bata opposed the creation of an institution reliant on public funds. The foundation (and later museum) is primarily funded from a trust created by the Batas' personal wealth.

Since its establishment, the foundation set out to find a building to house the collection, exhibit footwear, and house calceology research centres. Early proposals to build the museum near the Ontario Science Centre, or the Harbourfront neighbourhood of Toronto were suggested, but were both rejected. Bata initially made a bid to build the museum at Harbourfront, although it faced public protest. In a conciliatory gesture, the Metropolitan Toronto council proposed the foundation drop the name Bata from the name of the museum, although Sonja Bata refused and abandoned plans to build the museum at Harbourfront. The collection was first publicly displayed in Toronto in 1992 at the Colonnade retail complex. The foundation contracted Moriyama & Teshima Architects to design a museum to house the collection, which was opened to the public on 6 May 1995. The cost to construct the building was not disclosed by the Bata family or the foundation, although estimates reported to be C$8 million to C$12 million.

In January 2006, a pair of jewel-encrusted Indian majori slippers used by Sikandar Jah, along with a gold anklet, and toe ring were stolen from the museum. In 2006, the slippers were valued at approximately C$160,000, whereas the gold anklet was valued at C$45,000, and the toe ring at C$11,000. The stolen items were recovered several weeks later by the museum.

== Building ==
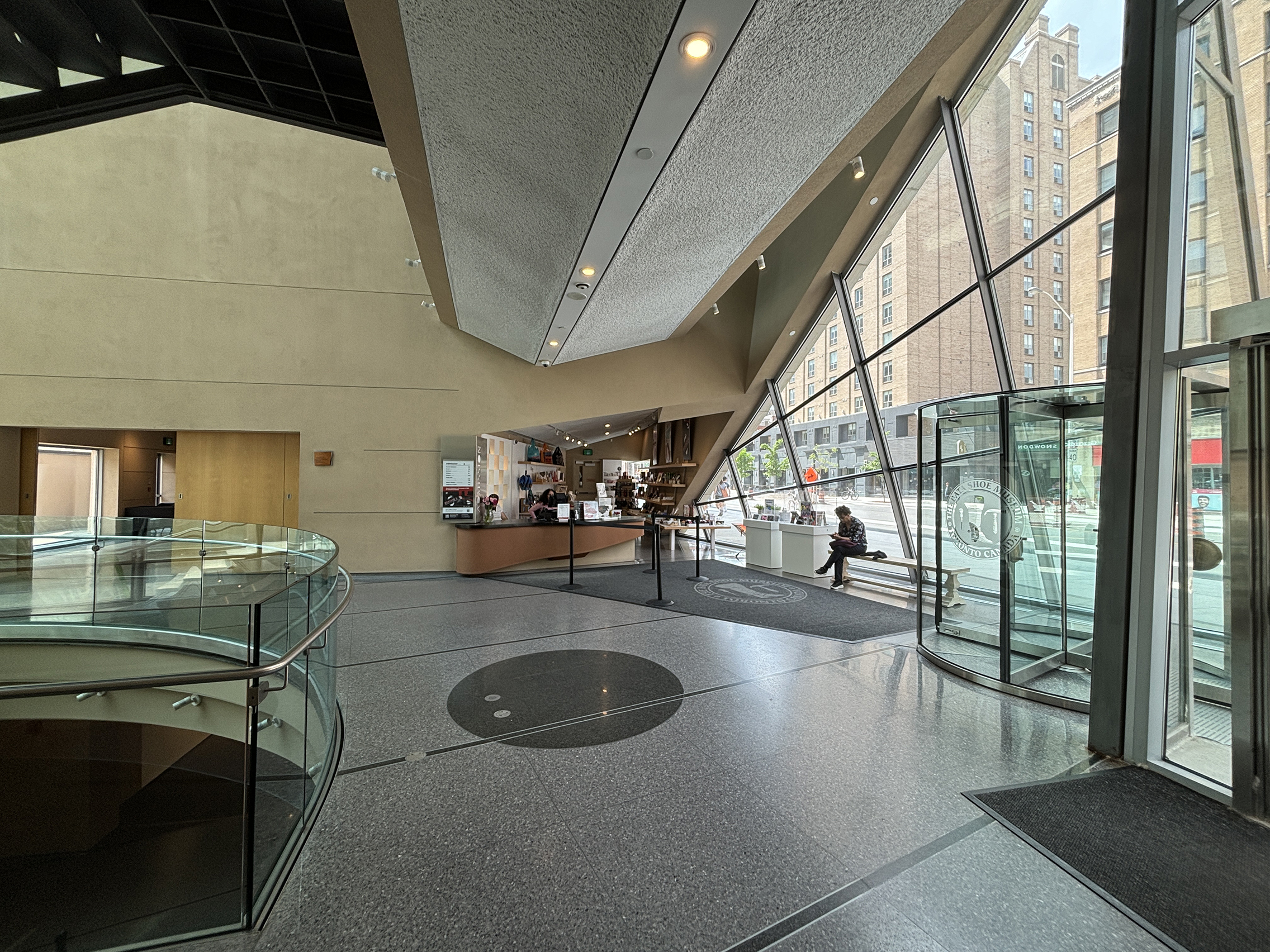
The building's glass entrance protrudes from the limestone facade

The museum is located in a 3,665-square-metre (39,450 sq ft) building at the southwest corner of St. George Street and Bloor Street West, near the northwest corner of the University of Toronto's St. George campus. Prior to the museum occupying the site, a gas station was situated on the property. St. George station is the closest Toronto subway station from the building.

The three-storey Deconstructivist-styled rectangular building was designed by Moriyama & Teshima Architects, with Raymond Moriyama as the project's lead. Moriyama was inspired to shape the building like the boxes used to store and protect the Batas' footwear collection when he viewed them in 1978. The three-storey building's roof is tilted, designed to appear as a lid sitting slightly askew atop a shoe box. The building utilizes most of the property's area, due to local zoning by-laws restricting the height of the building to 13.4 metres (44 ft). The building exterior is made out of smooth, angle canted limestone quarried from Lyon, France; and glass walls that protrude from the building's limestone facade, that serve as the entrance. The building's exterior also features windows 13 metres (42 ft) above the ground.

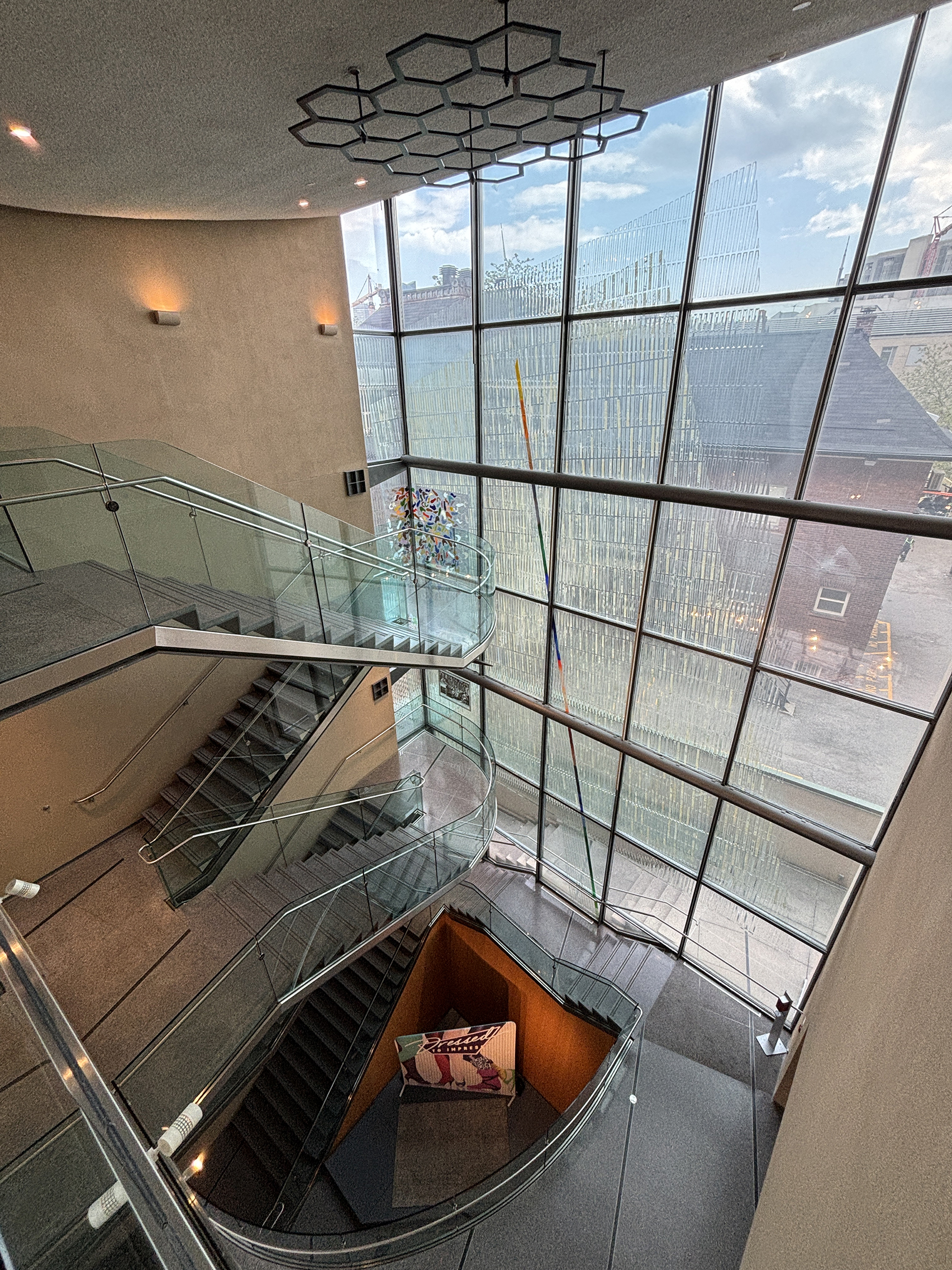
A 12.8-metre-high (42 ft) stained glass panel next is next the building's central staircase.

The interior of the structure is organized into three sections moving east to west, and spread across five floors. In addition to exhibit halls, the building also includes a gift shop, lecture theatre, and reception hall. The floors in the museum's lower levels are made of dark-coloured woods, shaped in diamond parquets, a trompe-l'œil that draws visitors' eyes to their own feet. The building's main hall features a central stairwell ornate with bronze medallions cast by Dora de Pedery-Hunt; and circles cut into the stair risers to let in light from the windows above. The stairway spans five floors in total, including two below ground. A 12.8-metre-high (42 ft) stained glass panel is next to the building's central staircase. The building's leather-clad reception desk is also designed to appear as a shoe from the stairway.

== Exhibitions ==
The museum building contains four exhibition galleries, used to exhibit the permanent, and temporary and travelling exhibitions. The museum presently operates only one permanent exhibition, All About Shoes: Footwear Through the Ages, with the other three galleries used to house temporary exhibitions. The museum's permanent exhibition is situated in the lower two levels in the building's east side, whereas specialized temporary exhibitions are situated in the galleries of the building's second and third levels. The exhibition galleries were designed as "neutral spaces," enabling the museum to host a variety of exhibitions. In order to accommodate the exhibits of delicate and fragile objects, the museum's galleries were all designed with strict environmental controls, with little natural light entering the galleries.

In addition to physical exhibitions held inside its building, the museum also operates online exhibitions, including an online component to the museum's All About Shoes permanent exhibition. The Virtual Museum of Canada has also hosted online exhibits created by the Museum.

=== Permanent exhibition ===
The museum's permanent exhibition, All About Shoes, provides a historical survey of footwear throughout history and includes interactive displays that highlight the social significance of shoes and their development from various cultures. The exhibition also features exhibits that examine the development of shoe-making technologies, with mini dioramas of shoe-making workshops throughout history with supplementary text and video.

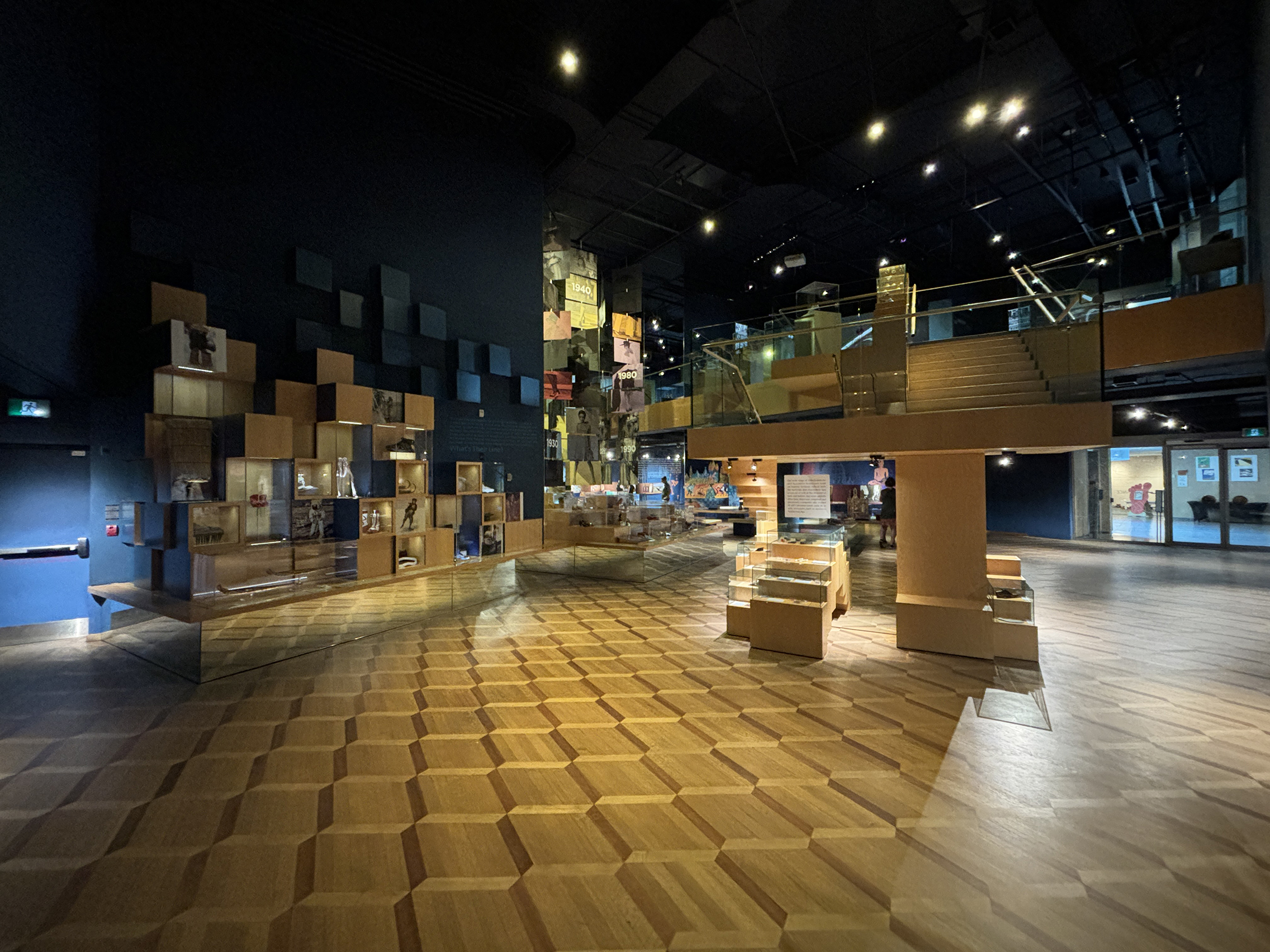
The lower level of the museum holds the museum's permanent exhibition, All About Shoes

The exhibition is made up of three components, Behind the Scenes: A Glimpse into Artifact Storage, Fashion Afoot, and What's Their Line Fashion Afoot is an exhibition component that examines the development of fashion shoes during the 20th century, and the emergence of footwear as a major fashion accessory. What's Their Line? examines purpose-built, specialized footwear including French chestnut-crushing clogs, and sumo wrestler's geta The Behind the Scenes component of the exhibition is where shoes, and other items from the museum's collection are placed on display.

The exhibits were devised by Montreal-based design firm Design+Communication Ltd., who designed the exhibits with the shoes placed close to the viewer, with monochromatic images of social life to provide context to the shoe's historical use. Larger architectural images intended to evoke the temporal cultural provenance of the shoes are also displayed behind these exhibits. Lighting in the exhibition is subdued, in an effort to protect the collection from deterioration. Shoes are typically displayed on a low-rising dais, typically built from blonde maple wood.

The smallest shoes typically on display in the permanent exhibition are 7.6 centimetres (3 in) Chinese shoes made for women who had their feet bound. The exhibition also features a plaster cast of the first known human-like footprint from Laetoli, made from 3.7 million years old footprints found in Tanzania.

=== Temporary exhibitions ===
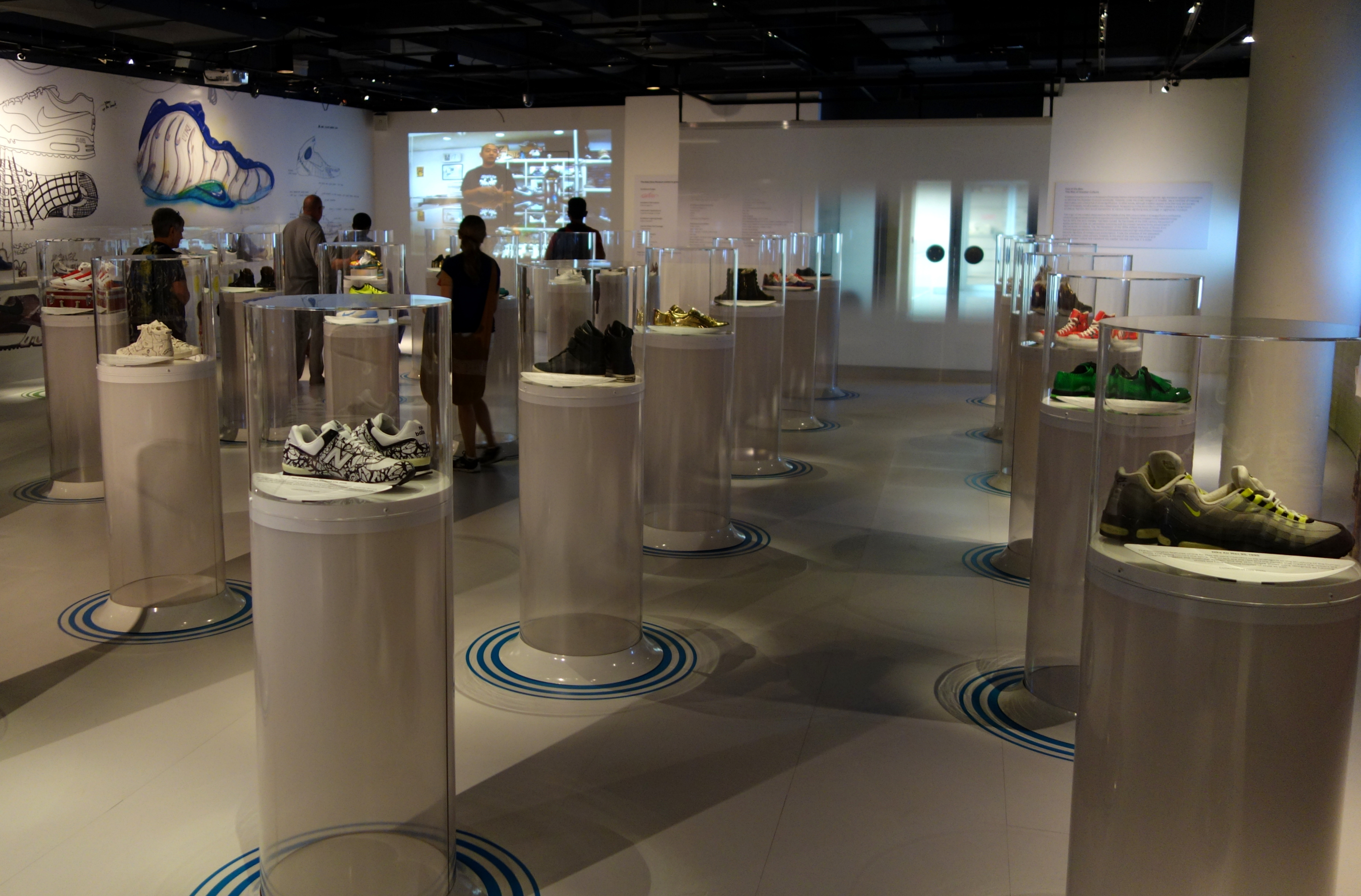
Exhibits for the Out of the Box travelling exhibition, held in 2013

The museum has organized and hosted a number of temporary, and travelling exhibitions in its other exhibition galleries. The museum hosted its first three temporary exhibitions in May 1995. These included The Gentle Step, which focused on the changing status of women in the 19th century, and was reflected in the development of their footwear; One, Two, Buckle My Shoe, an exhibition that focused on footwear in literature; and Inuit Boots: A Woman's Art, which focused on Inuit mukluk making. The following is a sample of temporary exhibitions held at the museum:

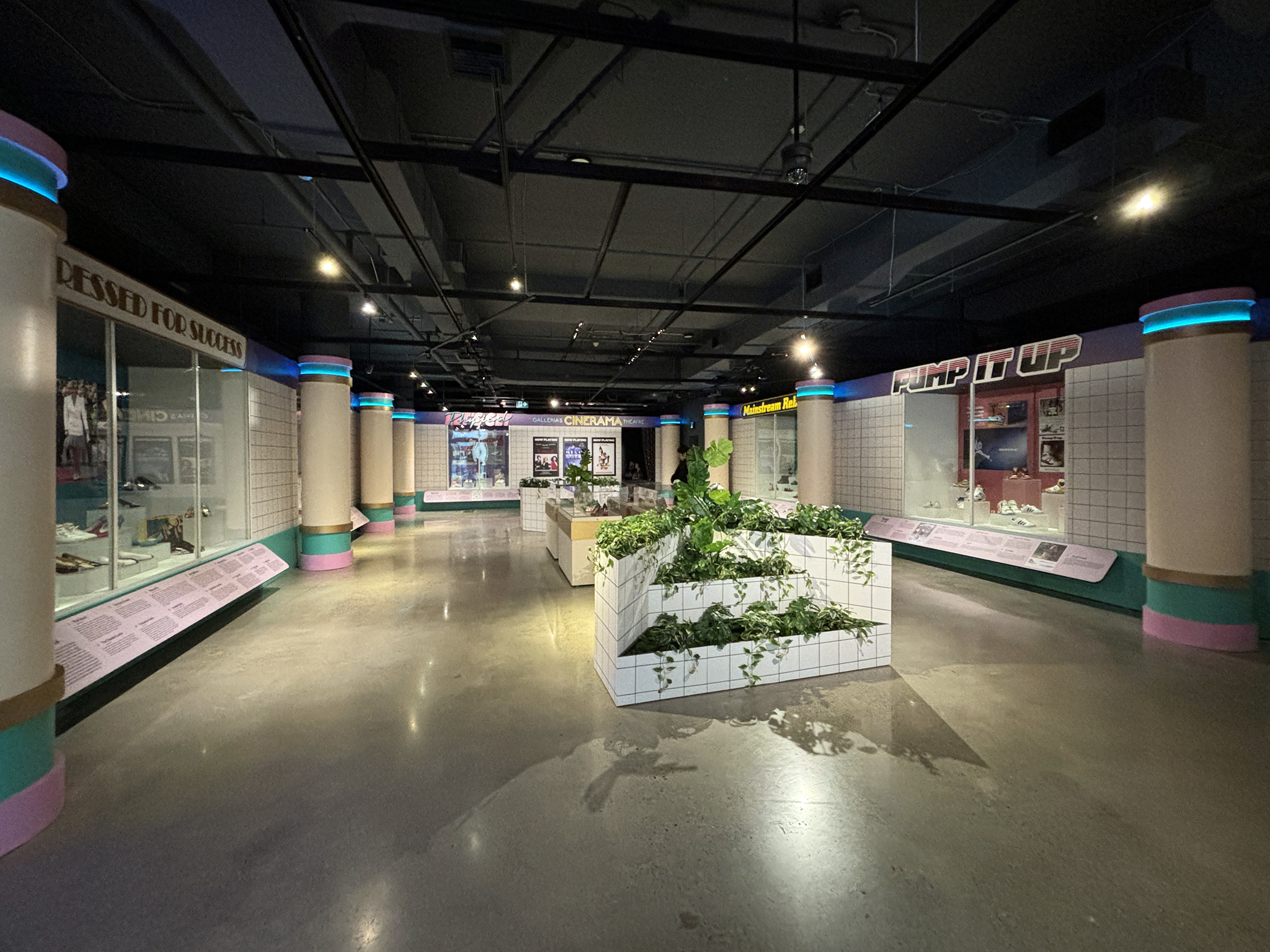
Exhibits for the Dressed to Impress Footwear and consumerism in the 1980s exhibition, held in 2024

- Inuit Boots: A Women's Art (1995–1996)
- One, Two, Buckle My Shoe: Illustrations from Contemporary Children's Books about Shoes (1995–1996)
- The Gentle Step – The Ladies Realm of Fashion 1800–1900 (1995–1997)
- Shoe Dreams: Designs by Andrea Pfister (1996–1997)
- Tradition and Innovation: Northern Athapaskan Footwear (1996–1997)
- Dance! – Minuet to Disco (1997–1999)
- Loose Tongues and Lost Soles: Shoes in Cartoon and Caricature (1997)
- Dance! (1997–1999)
- Footwear Fantasia: Shoe Sculptures by Garry Greenwood (1997)
- The Taming of the Shoe: From Attic to Exhibition (1997–1998)
- Spirit of Siberia (1997–1998)
- Little Feats: A Celebration of Children's Shoes (1998–1999)
- Footsteps on the Sacred Earth: Southwestern Native Footwear (1998–1999)
- Japanese Footgear: Walking the Path of Innovation (1999–2000)
- Herbert and Beth Levine: An American Pair (1999–1999)
- Paduka: Feet and Footwear in the Indian Tradition (1999–2000)
- Every Step a Lotus: Shoes in the Lives of Chinese Women from Late Imperial China (2001)
- Heights of Fashion: A History of the Elevated Foot (2001)
- The Perfect Pair: Wedding Shoe Stories (2002–2004)
- Paths Across the Plains: Native Footwear of the Great Plains (2004–2005)
- Icons of Elegance: Influential Shoe Designers of the 20th century (2005–2007)
- Watched by Heaven, Tied to Earth: Summoning Animal Protection for Chinese Children (2006–2007)
- The Charm of Rococo: Femininity and Footwear of the 18th century (2006–2008)
- On Pointe: The Rise of the Ballet Shoe (2008–2009)
- Beauty, Identity, Pride: Native North American Footwear (2009)
- On a Pedestal: From Renaissance Chopines to Baroque Heels (2009–2010)
- Socks: Between You and Your Shoes (2010)
- Art in Shoes/Shoes in Art (2010)
- The Roaring 20's: Hemlines, Heels and High Hopes (2011)
- Roger Vivier: Process to Perfection (2012)
- Collected in the Field: Shoemaking Traditions from Around the World (2013)
- Out of the Box: The Rise of Sneaker Culture (2013)
- Fashion Victims: The Pleasures and Perils of 19th Century Dress (2014)
- Standing Tall: The Curious History of Men in Heels (2015)
- Manolo Blahnik: The Art of Shoes (2018)
- WANT: Desire, Design and Depression Era Footwear (2018)
- The Gold Standard: Glittering Footwear From Around the Globe (2021)
- Art & Innovation: Traditional Arctic Footwear from the Bata Shoe Museum Collection (2021)
- All Dolled Up: Fashioning Cultural Expectations (2022)
- The Great Divide: Footwear in the Age of Enlightenment (2022)
- Future Now: Virtual Sneakers to Cutting-Edge Kicks (2023)
- Obsessed: How Shoes Became Objects of Desire (2023)
- In Bloom: Flowers & Footwear (2023)
- Dressed to Impress: Footwear and Consumerism in the 1980s (Now on view until March 2025)
- Exhibit A: Investigating Crime and Footwear (Now on view until September 2025)
- Art/Wear: Sneakers x Artists (Now on view until March 2026)

== Permanent collection ==
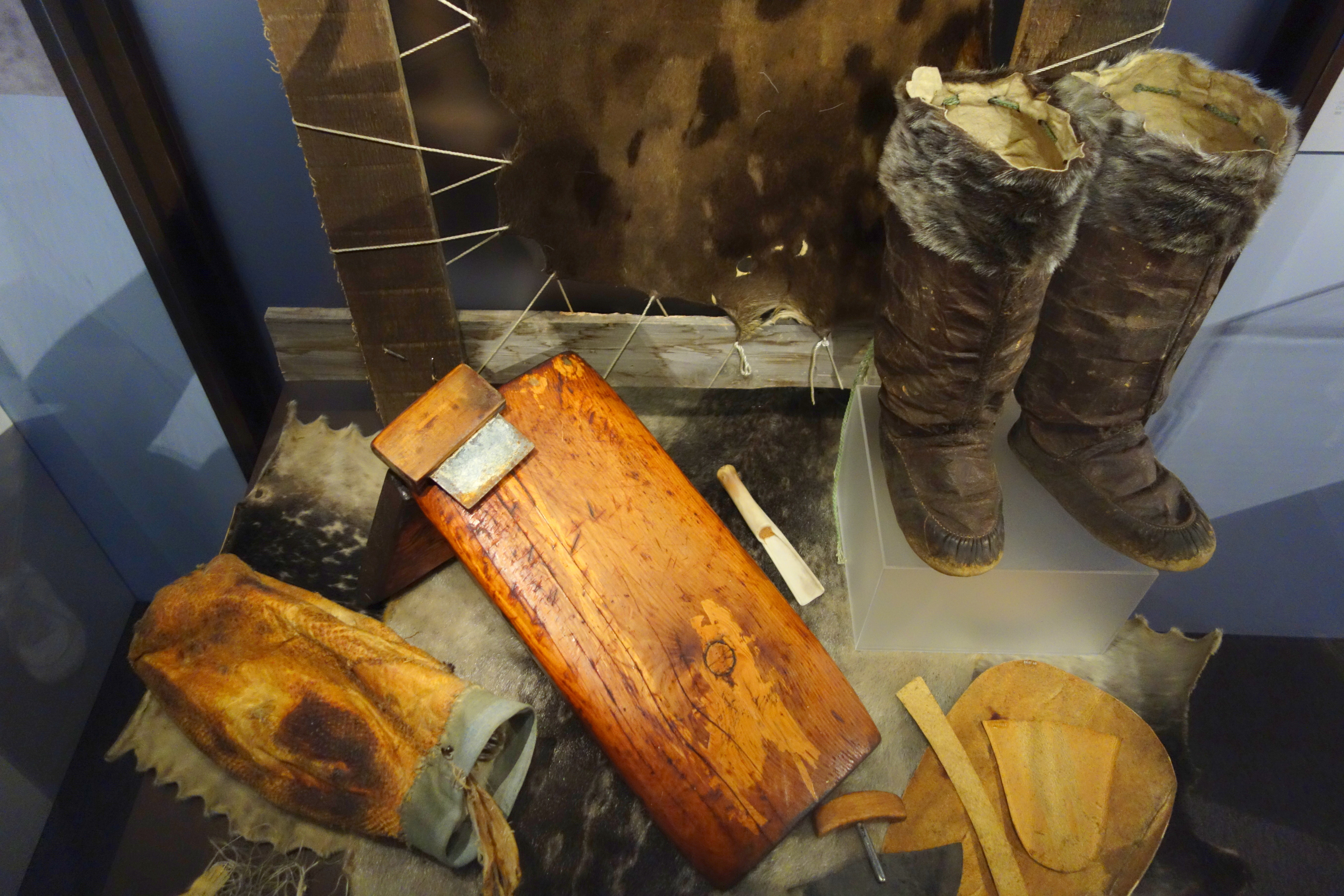
Inuit sealskin boots and shoe-making tools on display

As of April 2018, the museum's permanent collection includes over 13,000 shoes and related items dating back 4,500 years; providing the institution with the world's largest, and comprehensive collection of items entirely devoted to footwear, and shoes.

The collection was initially intended to serve as a "working collection" for the Bata family, in which shoe making techniques could be learned. Techniques and designs from shoes collected were used to mimic traditional styles found in local markets. However, the scope was later expanded to be a historical and anthropological collection, when Sonja Bata began to collect shoes from local populations where Bata factories were displacing local footwear, in an attempt to preserve and document shoes that were being replaced. The museum presently acquires items for its collection through auction, donations from other collectors, field work, or private vendors. The museum acts to conserve but not restore shoes, preventing ongoing deterioration, but not removing signs of wear or replace missing parts. The following is a part of the museum's philosophy in which it sees worn footwear as having significant cultural meaning. The museum does not restore its older, or heavily damaged pieces it acquires, instead treating it to preserve their present condition, and to prevent further deterioration.

The collection is organized into several cultural and geographic areas including Africa, China, India, Japan, Korea, Latin America, the Middle East, indigenous North American, and the circumpolar region. Footwear from First Nations, and northern Canada forms a major portion of the museum's collection. Approximately four per cent of the museum's collection is on display, with the remaining items kept in storage. Stored items are placed in one of two subterranean vaults. In addition to the vaults, the museum also places several "stored items" in cube cases situated in public areas of the museum, serving as a form of "visible storage".

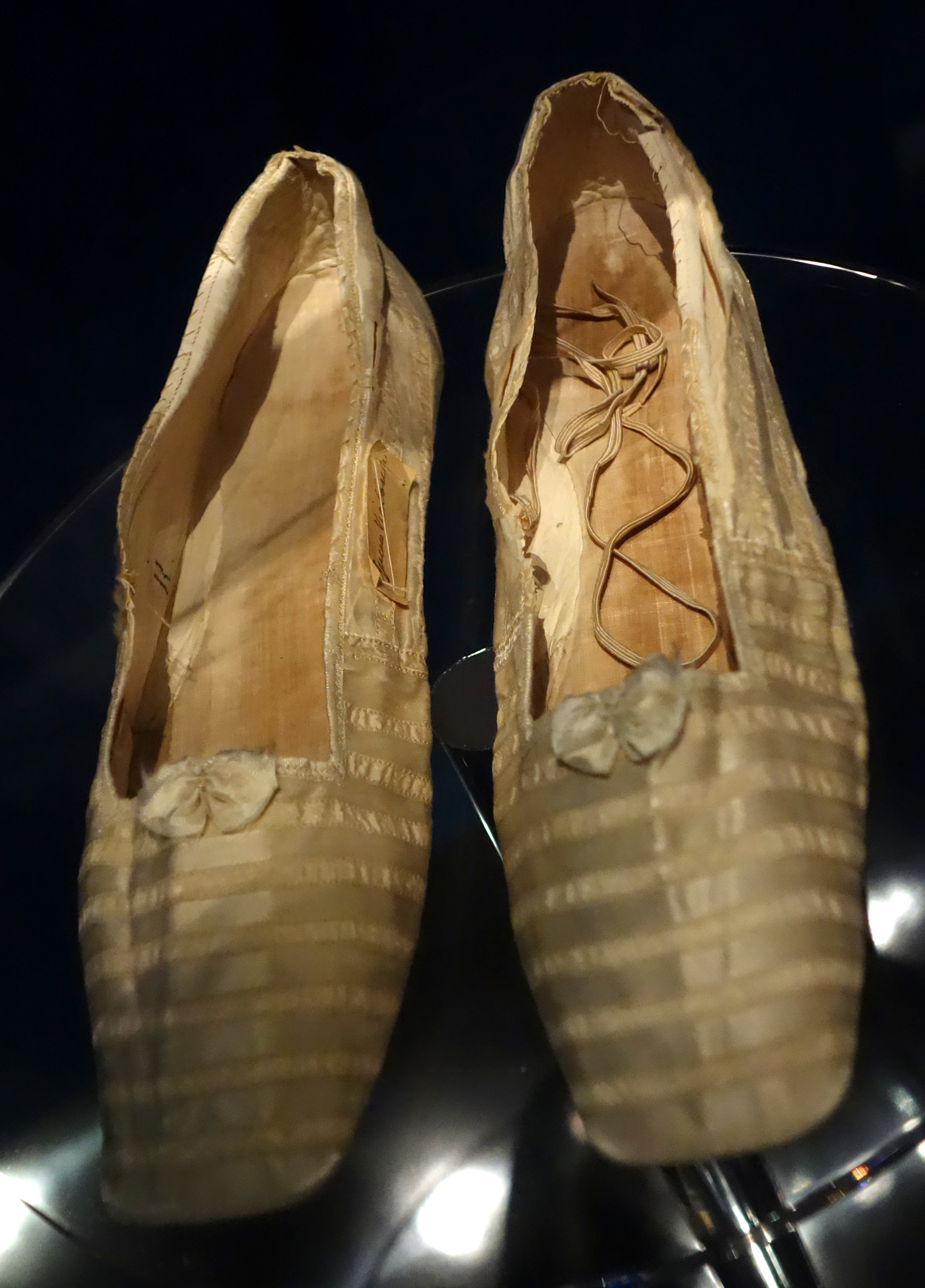
Silk-satin shoes worn by Queen Victoria on display

The museum's oldest piece of footwear from Europe are a pair of sandals, worn by a shepherd from the Tyrolian Alps around 5200 BP. The museum's oldest pair of shoes from the Americas is believed to be an Anasazi made from yucca fibres. The museum also holds a collection of shoes worn by notable individuals, including Pierce Brosnan, Roger Federer, Terry Fox, Elton John, Karen Kain, John Lennon, Madonna, Marilyn Monroe, Napoleon, Elvis Presley, Robert Redford, Elizabeth Taylor, Pierre Trudeau, and Queen Victoria.

== Research and programs ==
The Bata Shoe Museum conducts and sponsors research into understanding the role of footwear in cultural and social life. The Bata Shoe Museum Foundation has funded field trips to collect and research footwear in Asia, Europe, and circumpolar regions and cultures where traditions are changing rapid. The foundation has also produced academic publications. The museum is affiliated with Canadian Museums Association, Canadian Heritage Information Network, Ontario Association of Art Galleries, and the Virtual Museum of Canada,

The museum organizes lectures, performances, and social evenings, often with an ethnocultural focus or community partner. Events often illuminate a personal connection or a cultural context in which footwear was created. An annual lecture series, The Founder's Lecture is held each November and is a public event featuring an internationally recognized leading thinker engaged with the convergence of culture and society. The museum also hosts shoemakers from around the world to demonstrate shoe-making techniques to the public, in an attempt to counteract the displacement of local shoe-making forms.

=== Outreach ===
In 2018, nearly 9,000 students visited the museum for school related excursions. The museum has organized themed family activities. The museum holds an annual "Warm the Sole Sock Drive" fundraiser, which begins on World Kindness Day, to collect socks for donation to a local charity. The museum also operates the Step Ahead program, a program subsidized by the Bank of Montreal, providing at-risk children an opportunity to access the museum's interactive curriculum-based programs free of charge. In 2018, the museum saw 1,800 youths access its facilities through the Step Ahead program.

== Arms ==
The arms of the Bata Shoe Museum Foundation were formally registered with the Public Register of Arms, Flags and Badges of Canada on 6 May 1995. The coat of arms uses the official colours of the institution, blue and gold, and features a triangular division placed along the position of the thongs found on most sandals. The boot featured on the arms represents all footwear, whereas the two keys is a common symbol in Canadian heraldry for museums. The crest of the arms is animal skin, defaced with a knife, representing two materials used for shoe-making.

The museum's motto, One step at a time (or Latin: Per Saecula Gradatim), is featured on the museums arms. The motto is attributed to Robertson Davies, who suggested it when asked by Sonja Bata. The phrase has multiple meanings, suggesting the progression of the institution and its collection, the progression of research into footwear, and as a description for walking.

Coat of arms of Bata Shoe Museum
Notes The arms of the Bata Shoe Museum Foundation consist of: Adopted 14 October 1995 Crest A full skin Or edged and charged with a round knife blade upwards Azure Escutcheon Per chevron Or and Azure in chief two keys wards upwards to the dexter Azure and in base a boot Or Motto One Step at a Time

== See also ==
- Bata Shoes Head Office
- List of museums in Toronto
