= Bata, Burgas Province =

Bata
- Village
- Location within Bulgaria
- Coordinates: 42°44′N 27°30′E
- Country: Bulgaria
- Province: Burgas Province
- Municipality: Pomorie
- Time zone: UTC+2 (EET)
  - Summer (DST): UTC+3 (EEST)

Bata is a village in the municipality of Pomorie, in Burgas Province, in southeastern Bulgaria.
