= Bata Shoes Head Office =

Office building in Toronto, 1965–2004

Coordinates: 43.723471°N 79.333316°W

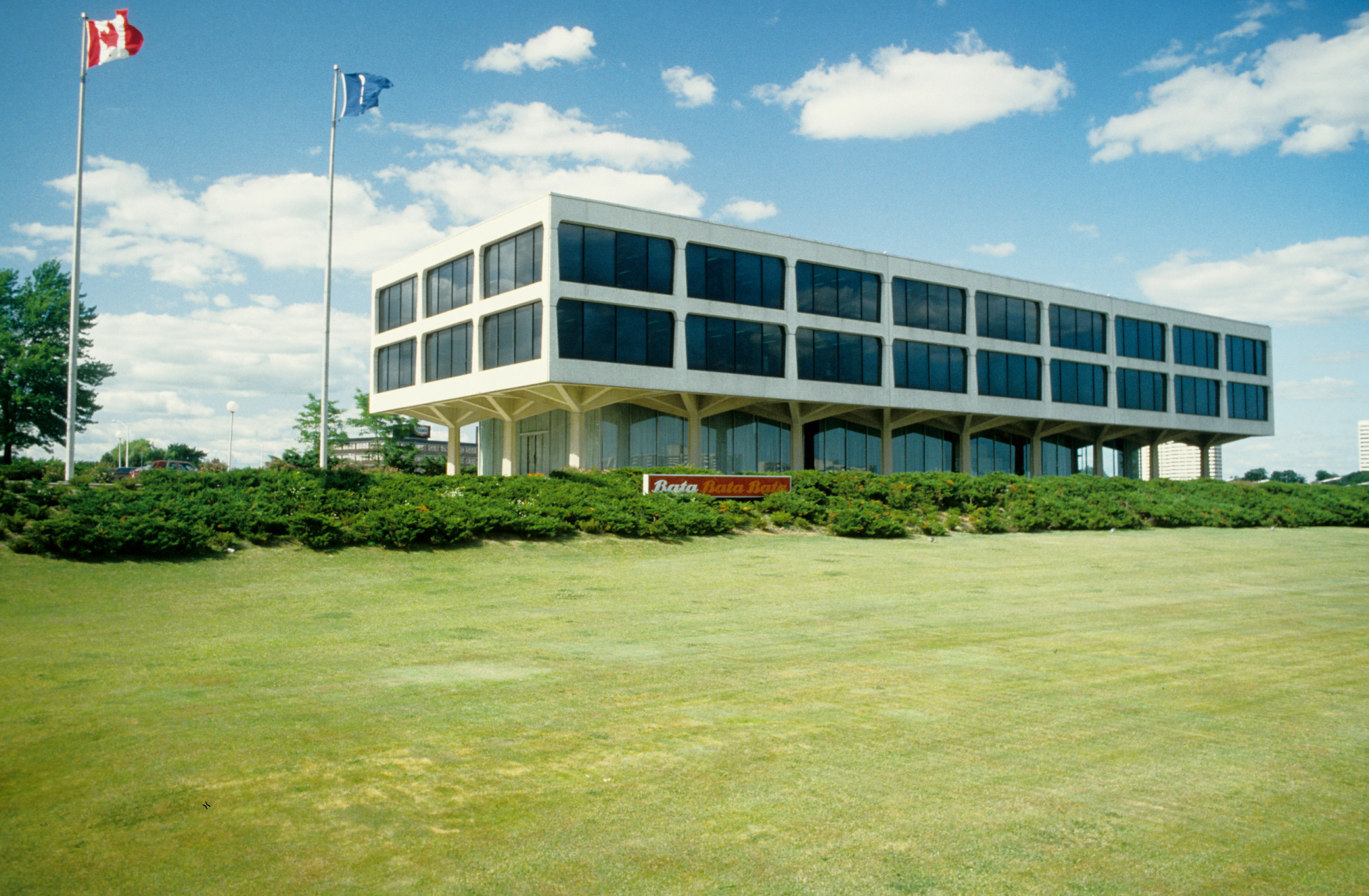
The Bata Building

The Bata Shoes Head Office in Toronto, Ontario, Canada, was Bata Shoes' former headquarters. The white, pavilion-like building, designed by architect John B. Parkin and completed in 1965 was considered by many as an example of the Modern Movement in architecture. Located atop a hill on Wynford Drive, by the major intersection of Eglinton Avenue and the Don Mills Road in the district of North York, its architecture and location made it a well-known landmark in the city. It was identified by the Toronto Society of Architects as one of 96 significant buildings and public spaces in Toronto built between 1953 and 2003.

It became the centre of debate when, in November 2002, the Aga Khan Foundation acquired the site and announced plans to demolish the building in order to construct a $300 million Ismaili centre, a museum of rare Islamic art and a public park. Toronto Star architecture critic Christopher Hume lauded the building prior to its demolition:

Situated on a height of land in Toronto's north end, the simple, modular edifice exemplifies the ideal of the building in a park. Simple and seemingly weightless, it rests on rows of columns, reminiscent of an ancient Greek temple. Unadorned yet poetic, the architecture pays homage to the past while extolling the virtues of the future.

Globe and Mail architecture critic Lisa Rochon was more critical of the structure:

the Bata is an imperfect work. Its north elevation is clumsy, with a porte-cochère intended as the connecting piece between the original building and a second (never built) retail space and warehouse tower. Instead, surface parking spreads out to the north and west of the building, fulfilling the deadening formula of the industrial office complex. The umbrella columns, though exhilarating to look at, are not as original as they might appear: They are a direct quotation from one of the buildings commissioned by Emhart Manufacturing Co. in Connecticut designed by the eminent American modernist firm Skidmore, Owings & Merrill.

From 2003 to 2004, the Bata head office operations were moved to Lausanne, Switzerland. Bata retained offices in Toronto for the headquarters for its "Power" brand of footwear in Toronto and the Bata Shoe Museum is also located in Toronto. In 2010, work on the Aga Khan Museum, the Ismaili Centre, Toronto and the park began. The project was completed in 2014.
