= Batawa =

Community in southeastern Ontario, Canada

Coordinates: 44°10′20″N 77°35′45″W

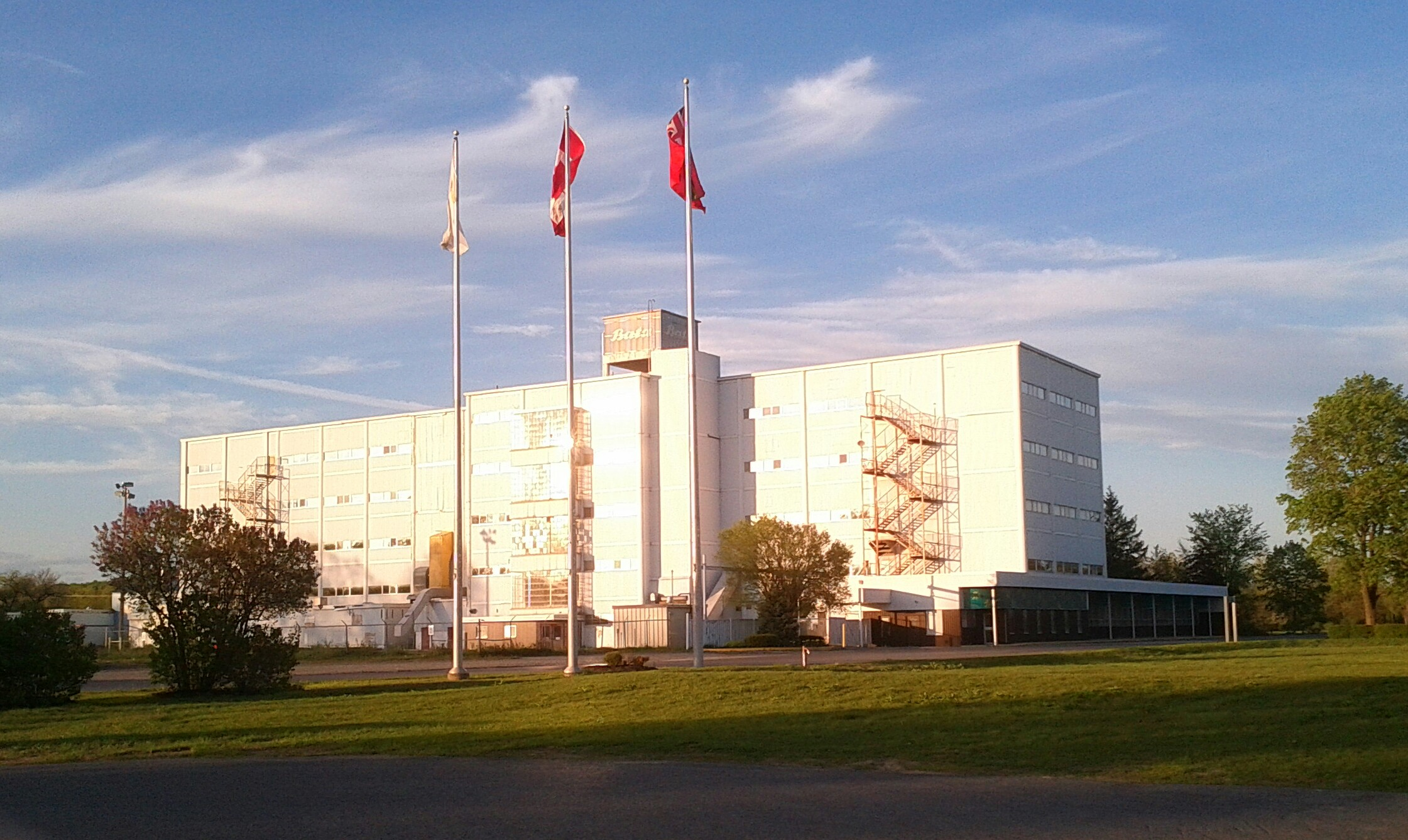
Bata factory in 2013

Batawa is a small community in southeastern Ontario, Canada, in the city of Quinte West. It was set up by the Bata Shoe company as a planned community around a shoe factory, which opened in 1939 and closed in 2000.

== History ==
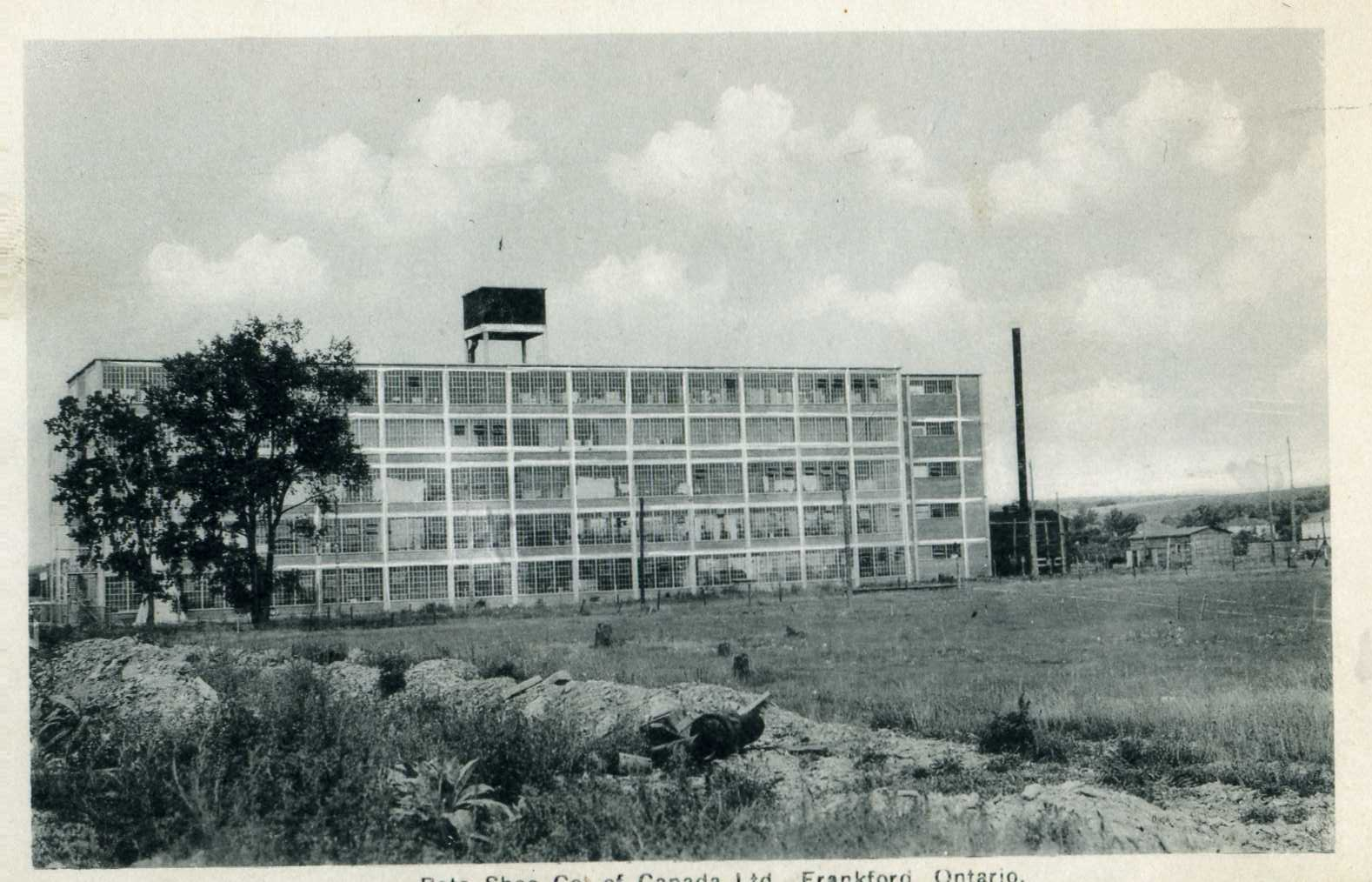
Batawa

Conditions in Europe before World War II led Thomas J. Bata to search for a location in Canada to transfer operations. Batawa's location was chosen for its proximity to a lake, a railway, a highway, an airport, and cheap land. A factory town was built and opened in 1939. The Bata company owned the town, providing accommodations at a reasonable rate to its workers. The company controlled virtually all aspects of the village. There was a Bata grocery store, Bata recreation hall, Bata clubs, Bata teams, and a Bata shoe store. Many of the residents were immigrants from Bata's homeland, Czechoslovakia, who immigrated at the time of the factory's construction. One prominent group of Bata's European refugees to resettle in Canada were the employees of the Bata Shoe Company from Zlín, Moravia, in 1939. Tomáš J. Baťa and 82 workers re-assembled the business in Batawa. The company would go on to produce military equipment for the Allied War effort.

The town was initially the headquarters of Bata Shoe operations in Canada; the headquarters moved to Toronto in 1964.

During the latter half of the 20th century, tariff barriers on shoe imports into Canada were reduced, allowing more and more low-cost shoes into Canada. Eventually, Bata determined the factory could not continue as a viable business operation and closed the factory in March 2000. As part of a strategy to cut costs, Bata consolidated production in lower-wage countries overseas. Bata Shoes closed its retail shoe stores in Canada one year later in 2001.

Dalton Company converted the old Batawa shoe plant into a high-end residential condo complex in 2018

== Geography ==
Batawa is situated on the west bank of the Trent River, and nearby is Lock 4 of the Trent-Severn Waterway, a major water transportation system.

== Community and culture ==
Batawa developed a distinct cultural identity shaped by its origins as a planned company town and by the large community of Czech and Slovak immigrants who arrived with the establishment of the Bata Shoe factory in 1939. Early residents brought Central European traditions that influenced local social life, cuisine, and community events. The Bata company supported a wide range of recreational and cultural activities, operating clubs, sports teams, and a recreation hall that served as the centre of village life.

After the closure of the factory in 2000, community organizations and volunteers continued to maintain many of these traditions. The Batawa Community Centre hosts seasonal events, social gatherings, and recreational programs, helping preserve the town’s close-knit character. The nearby Batawa Ski Hill, originally developed with support from the Bata family, remains a popular regional attraction and contributes to the community’s recreational identity.

== Services ==
- Quinte West Fire Department Station 5
- Sacred Heart Catholic School
- Sacred Heart Roman Catholic Church
- Batawa Community Centre

Batawa is represented by three councillors on Quinte West City Council for the Ward of Sidney.

== See also ==
- Batawa Ski Hill
- List of planned cities
