= Tomáš Baťa =

Czechoslovak entrepreneur (1876–1932)

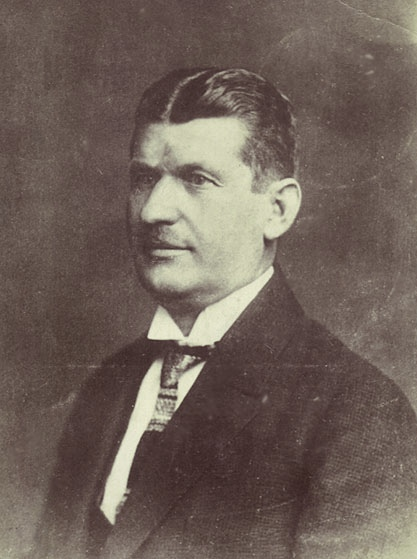
- Tomáš Baťa, 1920s
- Born: 3 April 1876; Zlín, Moravia, Austria-Hungary
- Died: 12 July 1932 (aged 56); Otrokovice, Czechoslovakia
- Occupation: Founder of Bata Shoes
- Children: Thomas J. Bata

Tomáš Baťa (Czech pronunciation: [ˈtomaːʃ ˈbaca]) (3 April 1876 – 12 July 1932) was a Czech entrepreneur and founder of Bata Shoes. He died in a plane crash caused by bad weather.

Baťa's half-brother Jan Antonín Baťa took over his company, expanding it during the Great Depression. World War II resulted in much destruction of the business. After Communist governments were established in Czechoslovakia and other nations of Eastern Europe, they nationalized the Baťa enterprises, taking over the company group.

Tomáš's son Thomas J. Bata rebuilt and expanded shoe manufacturing in the company name after moving to Canada in 1939, at the time of the Nazi invasion and annexation of Czechoslovakia.

== Career ==
Tomáš Baťa established the organization in Zlín on 24 August 1894 with 800 Austrian gulden (equivalent to $320 at the time), inherited from his mother. His brother Antonín Baťa and sister Anna were partners in the startup firm T. & A. Bata Shoe Company. Though this organization was newly established, the family had a long history of shoemaking, spanning eight generations and over three hundred years. This heritage helped boost the popularity of his new firm very quickly.

In 1904, Baťa travelled to Lynn, a city outside Boston, Massachusetts, in the United States that was then the center of world footwear production. He worked on an assembly line and learned about its machinery, such as Matzeliger's automated laster. He began mechanizing his production upon his return and introduced an assembly line at Zlín in 1927. With modern production and long-distance retailing, Baťa modernized the shoemaking industry. From its start, the company developed rapidly in production and its profits rose.

Tomáš Baťa obtained sole control over the company in 1908 after his brother Antonín Baťa died from tuberculosis. Tomáš brought two of his younger brothers, Jan and Bohuš, into the business. World War I created a booming demand for military shoes, which the company started to produce. During the interwar period, Baťa again visited the United States, to observe progress at the River Rouge Plant of Henry Ford in Dearborn, Michigan. Upon his return, he directed his company to look towards decentralizing operations.

Baťa recognized the needs of his customers, whose purchasing power had been significantly reduced in the aftermath of the war, and enlarged his offerings to produce low-cost shoes for the general public. He also established factories and companies in other countries, including Poland, Yugoslavia, France, the Netherlands, Denmark, the United Kingdom and, away from Europe: the United States and India. These factories were allowed to be self-sufficient and autonomous in their design, production and distribution strategies, in order to be able to cater to their local population. By the early 1930s, Bata had led the Baťa enterprise and Czechoslovakia to be the world's leading footwear exporters.

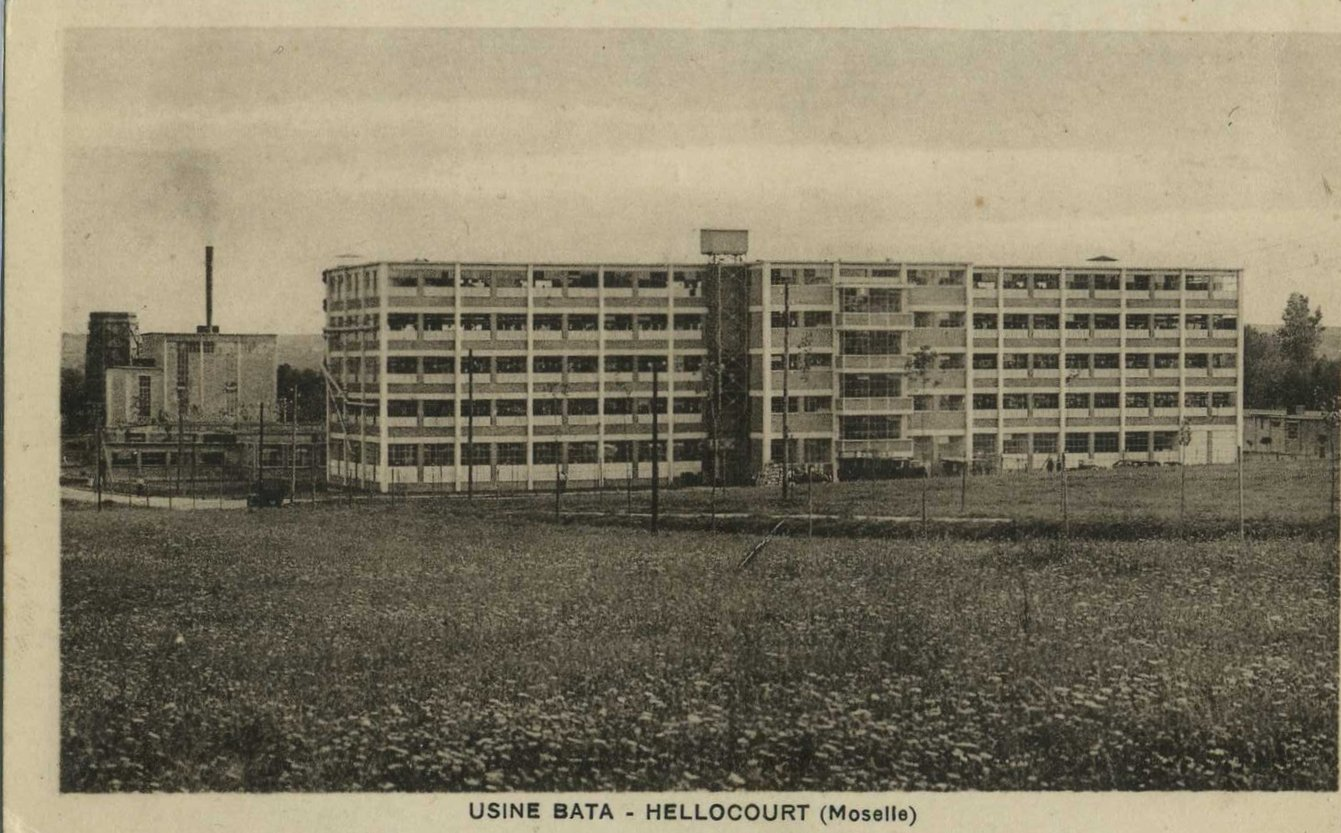
Bata factory at Bataville, France, appr. 1940.

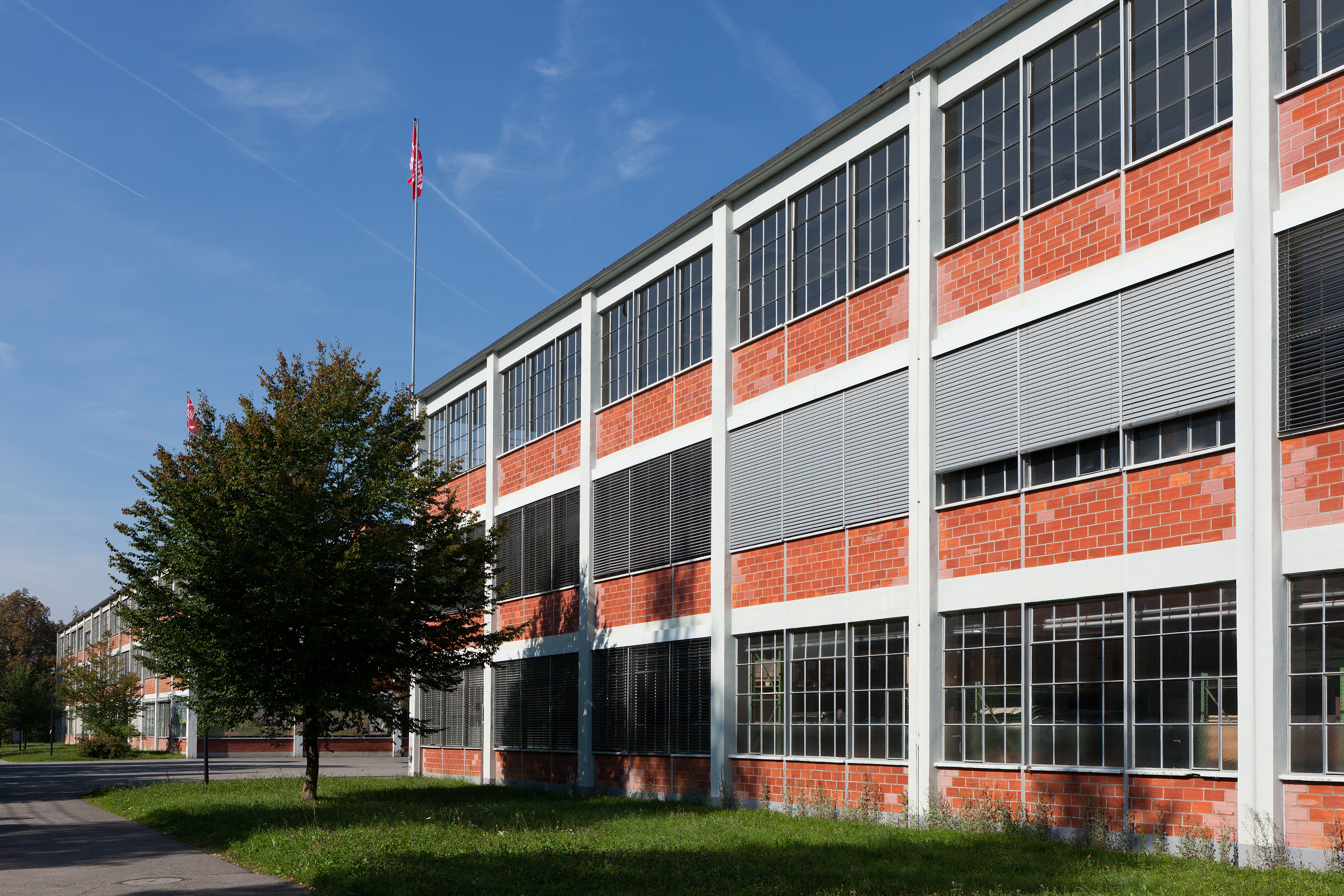
Bata factory at Bata-Park, Möhlin, Switzerland

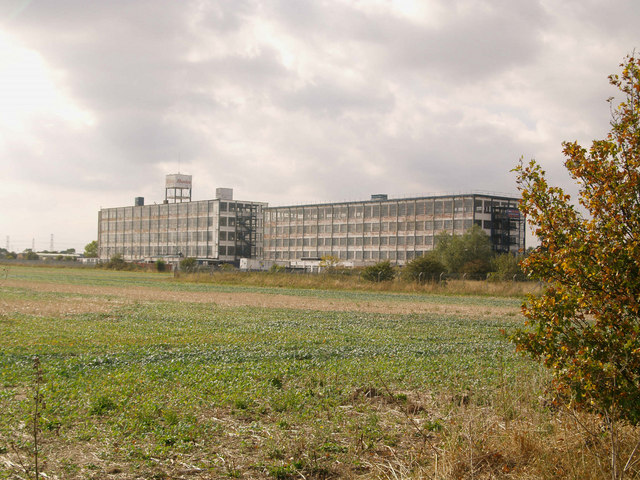
Bata factory at Bata Estate, Tilbury, the United Kingdom.

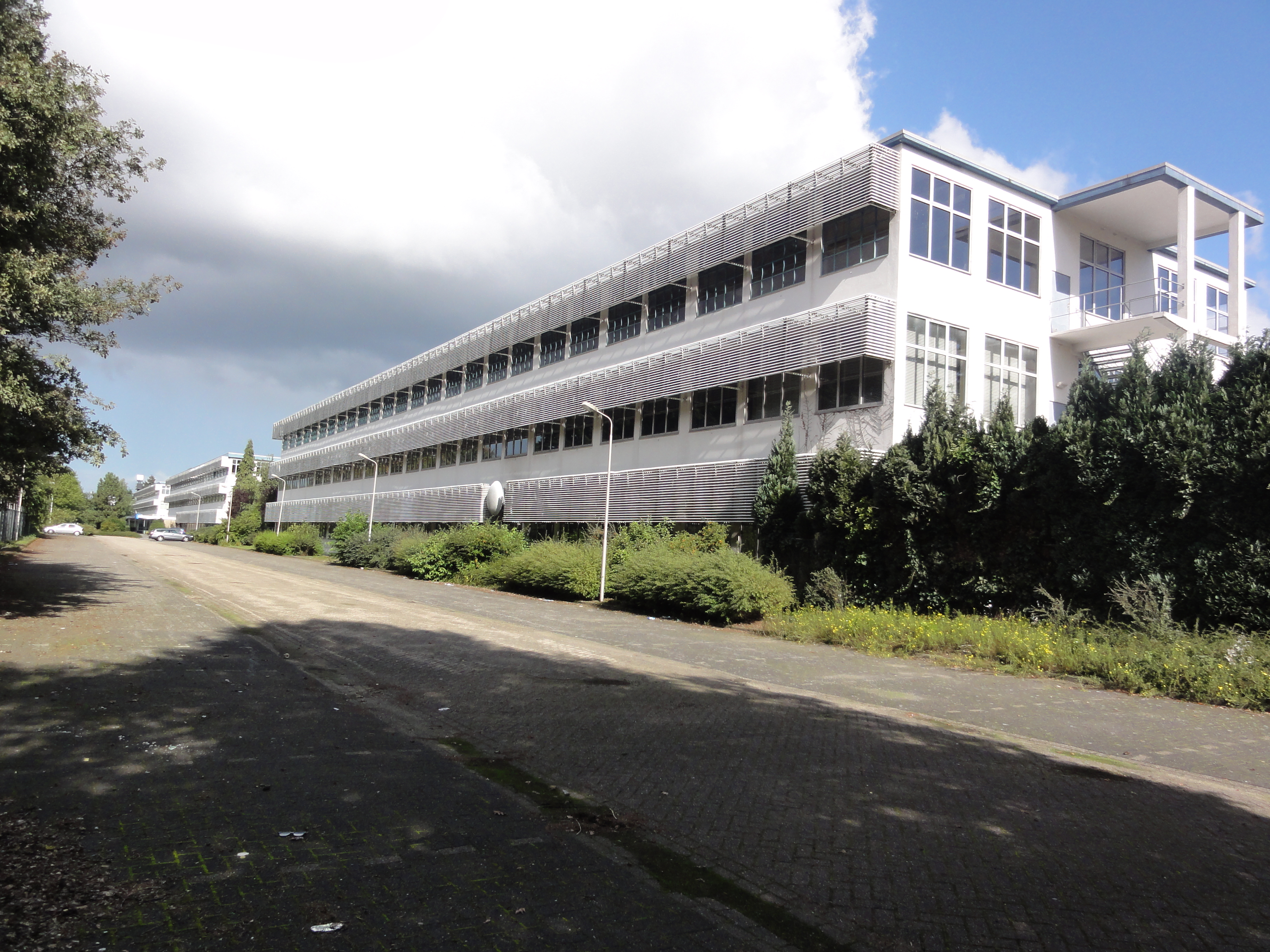
The three Bata factories in line at Batadorp, Best, the Netherlands.

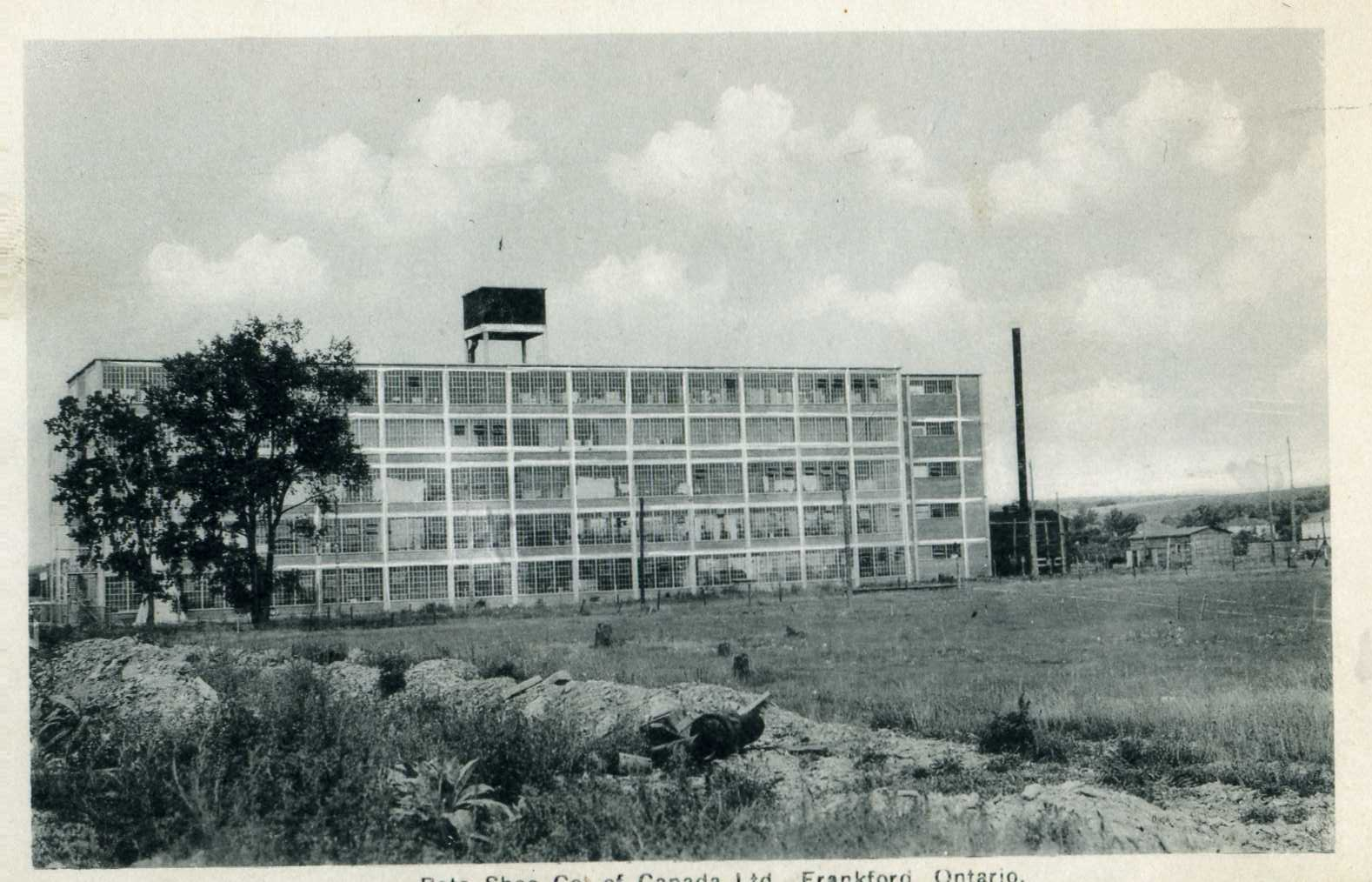
Bata factory at Batawa, Ontario, Canada.

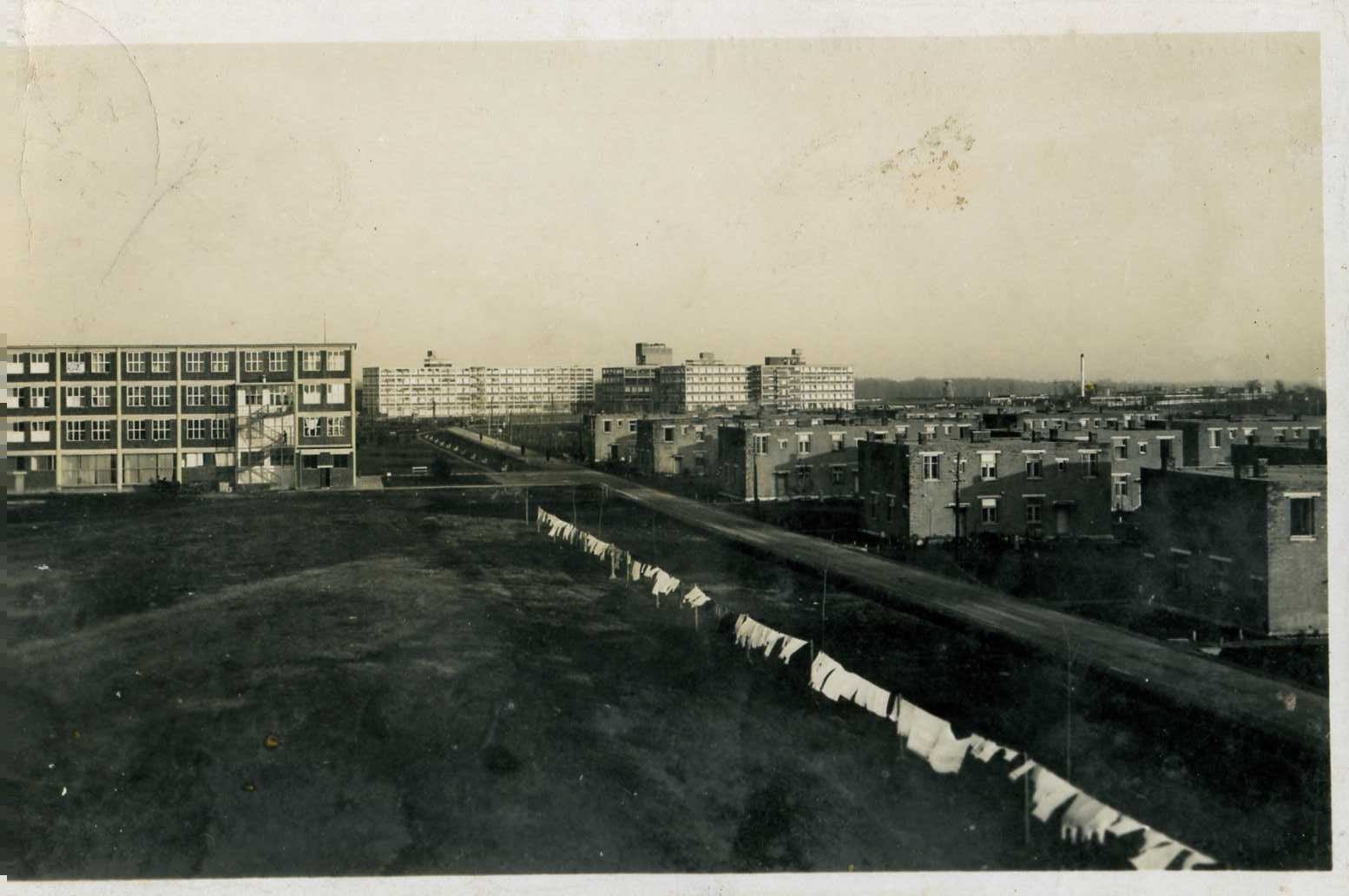
Former Bata factory in Vukovar (modern Croatia), 1930s

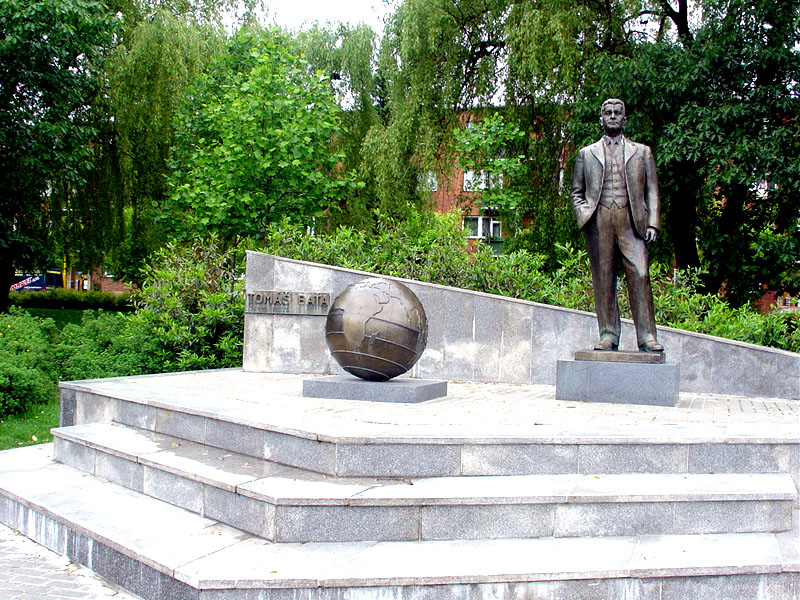
Baťa statue in Otrokovice, Czech Republic

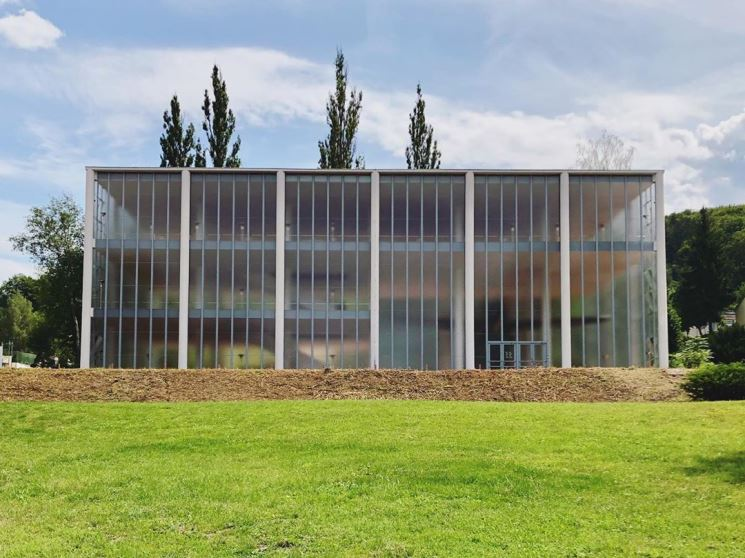
Tomas Bata Memorial in Zlín, Czech Republic

Baťa was regarded as an advocate of Taylorism, functionalism and a proponent of many aspects of the Garden city movement.

Bata is credited with efforts to modernize his hometown, both through employment and construction of housing facilities, making him a very popular citizen. He was elected as mayor of Zlín. Baťa is widely regarded as a businessman with an acute sense of social consciousness. He is quoted by many as one of the first pioneers of employee welfare and social advancement programs. Tomáš Baťa stated:

"Let's bear in mind that the chances to multiply wealth are unlimited. All people can become rich. There is an error in our understandings - that all people cannot become equally rich. Wealth can not exist where the people are busy with mutual cheating, have no time for creating values and wealth. It is remarkable that we can find the greatest number of wealthy tradesmen and a population on a high standard of living in countries with a high level of business morality. On the other hand, we can find poor tradesmen and entrepreneurs and an impoverished population in countries with a low standard of business morality. This is natural because these people concentrate on cheating one another instead of trying to create value.
We are granting you the profit share not because we feel a need to give money to the people just out of the goodness of the heart. No, we are aiming at other goals by this step. By this measure we want to reach a further decrease of production costs. We want to reach the situation that the shoes are cheaper and workers earn even more. We think that our products are still too expensive and worker's salary too low."

== Baťa's leadership for quality and innovation ==
In a scholarly study of Tomáš Baťa as a leader and business innovator, Myron Tribus states:

"When I first began this paper, I intended to demonstrate that what Baťa did is a superb illustration of what is now called "quality management". The record shows that Tomáš Baťa did indeed precede modern "quality management" practices by at least half a century. If we look only at that side of the man, we must conclude that he was the first to use quality as a way to lower cost at the same time as he created customer delight."

"However, as I delved more deeply into Baťa's management methods, it became clear that looking at his work through such a lens gives much too narrow a focus. It is possible, of course, to analyze Baťa's work as an example of what W. Edwards Deming has called his "System of Profound Knowledge". However, the level of abstraction at which Dr. Deming describes this system makes it capable of encompassing many different activities and while it provides great generality, it does not provide a focus on what was unique about Baťa. I have chosen a less abstract approach, concentrating on the Baťa contributions I thought would be of greatest value in contemporary management. My objective is to find the most important lessons that the Baťa system of management can teach today's entrepreneurs."

Wages scheme

Tomáš Baťa used 4 basic types of wages:

- Fixed rate - paid to a technical-operative and an administrative staff
- Individual order based rate - paid to some manufacture specialists
- Collective task rate - defined for manufacture labour
- Profit contribution rate - paid to operational managers

Also typical is so called "Baťa price", establishing a price usually ending in the number nine. He found that psychologically, a price of 99 or 19.99 was apparently more appealing to customers than a rounded number, such as 100 or 20, even though the difference is just 1 currency unit.

Aviation

Baťa considered aviation another branch of commercial activity. His company was apparently the world's first to use air transportation for travel of not only high-echelon staff, but also to send skilled workers quickly to places where their skills were critically needed. The emphasis was on timely deployment of manpower, not on the creation of prestige travel for a few chosen.

== Death and future of company ==
Baťa died in a plane crash (Junkers F.13 D-1608) in 1932 near the Zlín airport while trying to fly to Möhlin in Switzerland on a business trip under bad weather conditions of dense local fog.

After his death, his half-brother Jan Antonín Baťa took over ownership of the Bata companies. He greatly expanded the business into new fields, even during the Great Depression. He founded the famous Zlin aircraft works two years after Baťa's death, starting with simple gliders. From the 1930s to the eve of the World War II, he developed for sale several sophisticated types (e.g. the Walter Mikron avgas-powered Zlín Z-XII, which was widely exported, and the Z-XIII, as well as some successful sailplanes) and aero engines. The Moravan-Zlin factory is the direct descendant of Jan Bata's Czech aviation legacy.

In addition, Jan Antonín Baťa started new manufacturing and set up markets in numerous new countries. In 1939 after the Nazi invasion and occupation of Czechoslovakia, he tried to negotiate to keep the company, before emigrating to the United States. In 1941 he resettled in Brazil, where he continued to act as an entrepreneur, creating several company towns. World War II resulted in much destruction of Bata businesses in Europe and Asia. After Communist governments were established in Central and Eastern Europe, they took over and nationalized the companies.

== Legacy ==
In 1934 his son Tomáš Baťa established an industrial manufacturing unit south of Kolkata, India. It was a complete industrial settlement and was named Batanagar. A Metro station in Delhi, Bata Chowk, is also named after him.

Anticipating the Second World War, Baťa's son Thomas J. Bata, along with over 100 families from Czechoslovakia, moved to Canada in 1939. There he developed the Bata Shoe Company of Canada, founding the factory town of Batawa, Ontario.

During the Second World War, many Baťa businesses in Europe and the Far East that had been developed by Jan Baťa were destroyed. After the War, the core business enterprise in Czechoslovakia and other major enterprises in Central and Eastern Europe were nationalized by the Communist governments.

Thomas J. Bata devoted himself to the rebuilding and development of the Bata Shoe Organization, together with his wife and partner Sonja Bata. He successfully expanded into new markets throughout Asia, the Middle East, Africa, and Latin America. Under his leadership, the Bata Shoe Organization had unprecedented growth. It became the world's largest manufacturer and marketer of footwear selling over 300 million pairs of shoes each year and employing over 80,000 people.

=== In fiction ===
- Musical revue, Ostrov Dynamit, 1930 (Dynamite Island) by Jiří Voskovec, Jan Werich, and the composer Jaroslav Ježek. This comedy satirized Tomáš Baťa as the villain Thomas Batha, who together with his Chinese servant Wu-Fang, exploit the natives of a tropical island in the South Pacific. The plot revolves around the magical powers of the island's volcano, which every fifty years erupts, releasing a beneficial gas that lulls the people into calm and docility. Batha is the only one unaffected, as he uses a gas mask hidden in a forest (the exact location of which, however, he is unable to find).
- Novel, Obuv', 1932 (Shoes), a part of Our day chronicles by Ilya Ehrenburg
- Novel, Botostroj, 1933 (The Shoe-Machine) by Svatopluk Turek. This communist writer portrayed Tomáš Baťa as a strong-willed dictator who sacrificed himself and all people around for success of the company. After its release, Jan Bata sued for defamation and tried to stop further publishing. In 1954, Turek's novel was adapted as a movie of the same name, made by director K.M. Walló.
- Bata is featured as a character in Vikram Seth's novel A Suitable Boy, but his firm is called the "Praha" (Prague) Shoe Company.

== See also ==
- Bata shoe factory (East Tilbury)
- Bata Shoe Museum
- McMansion
- Tomas Bata Memorial
