= Czech Brazilians =

Czech Brazilians Tcheco-brasileiro · Český Brazilec
- (Brazil) (Czech Republic)
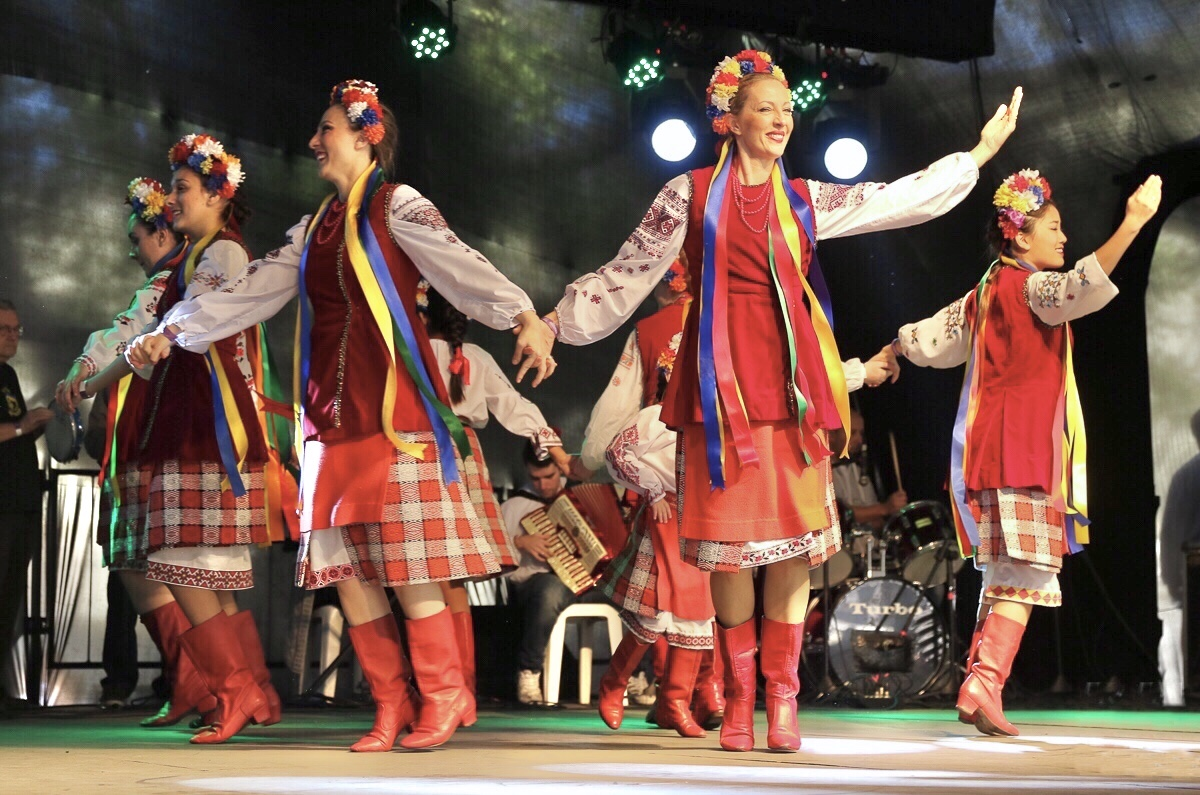
- Czech descendants in São Paulo.

Total population
- 5,000

Regions with significant populations
- Brazil: Mainly Southern Brazil and Minas Gerais

Languages
- Predominantly Portuguese · Some also speak Czech

Religion
- Predominantly Roman Catholic

Related ethnic groups
- Other White Brazilians, Czech people, Polish Brazilians

Czech Brazilians refer to Brazilians of Czech descent who were born in or who trace their ancestry to the territory of the historic Czech lands or succession states, now known as the Czech Republic, and are residents or citizens of Brazil.

== Czech people in Brazil ==
Although Czech Jesuits such as Valentin Stansel had been working in Brazil since the 18th century, the first Czech immigrants arrived in 1823. Among these early immigrants was Jan Nepomuk Kubíček, a Catholic carpenter from Třeboň and one of the great-grandfathers of Juscelino Kubitschek, the 24th President of Brazil (from 1956 to 1961).

In the 20th century, there were three large waves of Czechs who moved to Brazil: in the 1930s, after the Communist takeover (1948) and after the occupation of Czechoslovakia by the Warsaw Pact troops (1968). Most of those immigrants settled down in Southern Brazil.

=== Southern Brazil ===
More or less influence of the Czech immigration can be noticed in the three states of Southern Brazil (Santa Catarina, Paraná, and Rio Grande do Sul). In such states, the Czechs arrived since the 19th century and were often a minority in areas predominantly settled by Germans or Poles.

In Santa Catarina, the Czech immigrants occupied the regions of Vale do Itajaí and Northern parts of the state, e.g. Joinville, São Bento do Sul and Mafra.

In Rio Grande do Sul, most Czechs settled down in the Serra Gaúcha (notably in the town of Nova Petrópolis), the North Coast, the area of Missões and the Central Lowlands.

In Paraná, the Czech immigration is noticeable in the Northern areas, e.g. Rolândia and Londrina, where in 1932-1940s Czechs and Poles used to dispute the available lands for coffee cultivation, particularly in the rural district of Warta (Northern Londrina).

=== Central-Western Brazil ===
In Central-Western Brazil the Czech immigrants arrived mostly in the 1940-1950s led by the entrepreneur Jan Antonín Baťa, a Czech shoe manufacturer who left Czechoslovakia after the Nazi occupation of the Sudetenland.

The colonization of part of the Southeastern region of the state of Mato Grosso do Sul was made possible thanks to the Companhia Viação São Paulo-Mato Grosso (São Paulo-Mato Grosso Transport Company) owned by Baťa and managed by another Czech immigrant, Vladimir Kubik.

== Institutions and Cultural Organizations ==
- União Cultural Tcheco-Brasileira - Česko-brazilský kulturní svaz - São Paulo, SP
- Oficina Cultural Tcheco Eslovaca do Brasil - Česká a slovenská kulturní dílna Brazílie - Nova Andradina, MS
- Centro de Memória Jindřich Tracha - Centrum památky Jindřicha Trachty - Batayporã, MS
- Associação Cultural Theca-Brasileira - Česko-brazilské kulturní sdružení - Porto Alegre, RS
- Associação dos Descendentes de Imigrantes da Bohêmia em Nova Petrópolis - Sdružení potomků imigrantů z Česka - Nova Petrópolis, RS

== Notable Czech Brazilians ==
- Countess Elisabeth Dobržensky de Dobrženicz
- František Lorenz
- Fred Figner
- Jan Antonín Baťa
- Jan Nepomuk Kubíček
- Juscelino Kubitschek
- Lavínia Vlasak
- Otto Richard Gottlieb
- Tomas Valdemar Hintnaus
- Valentin Stansel
- Vilém Flusser
- Vladimir Kubik
- Walter Smetak

== See also ==
- Brazil–Czech Republic relations
- Czech diaspora
- European Brazilians
- Prague Spring
- Immigration to Brazil
- Johann Baptist Emanuel Pohl
- Patriots Museum of Brazilian Emigration
