= Kubik =

Kubik or Kubík may refer to:

- 11598 Kubík, a main-belt asteroid
- Kubik (comics), a Marvel Comics character
- Kubik, a fictional planet created by British band Coldplay as part of the concept of their 2021 album Music of the Spheres

== People ==
- Anna Kubik (born 1957), Hungarian actress
- Arkadiusz Kubik (born 1972), Polish footballer
- František Kubík (born 1989), Slovak footballer
- Gail Kubik (1914–1984), American composer
- Gerhard Kubik (born 1934), Austrian music ethnologist
- Karl Kubik, Austrian footballer in the early 20th-century
- Ladislav Kubík (1946–2017), Czech-American composer
- Luboš Kubík (born 1964), Czech footballer and manager
- Łukasz Kubik (born 1978), Polish footballer
- Nicole Kubik (born 1978), basketball player
- Renata Kubik (born 1983), Serbian sprint canoer
- Tomáš Kubík (footballer, born 1992), Slovak football player
- Tomáš Kubík (footballer, born 2002), Slovak football player
- Tomáš Kubík (painter) (born 1977), Czech painter
- Vladimir Kubik, a Brazilian manager of the Companhia Viação São Paulo-Mato Grosso

== See also ==
- KUBIK, part of the payload for SpaceX CRS-7
- KUBIK, a loudspeaker manufactured by Danish Audiophile Loudspeaker Industries
