= Brazil–Czech Republic relations =

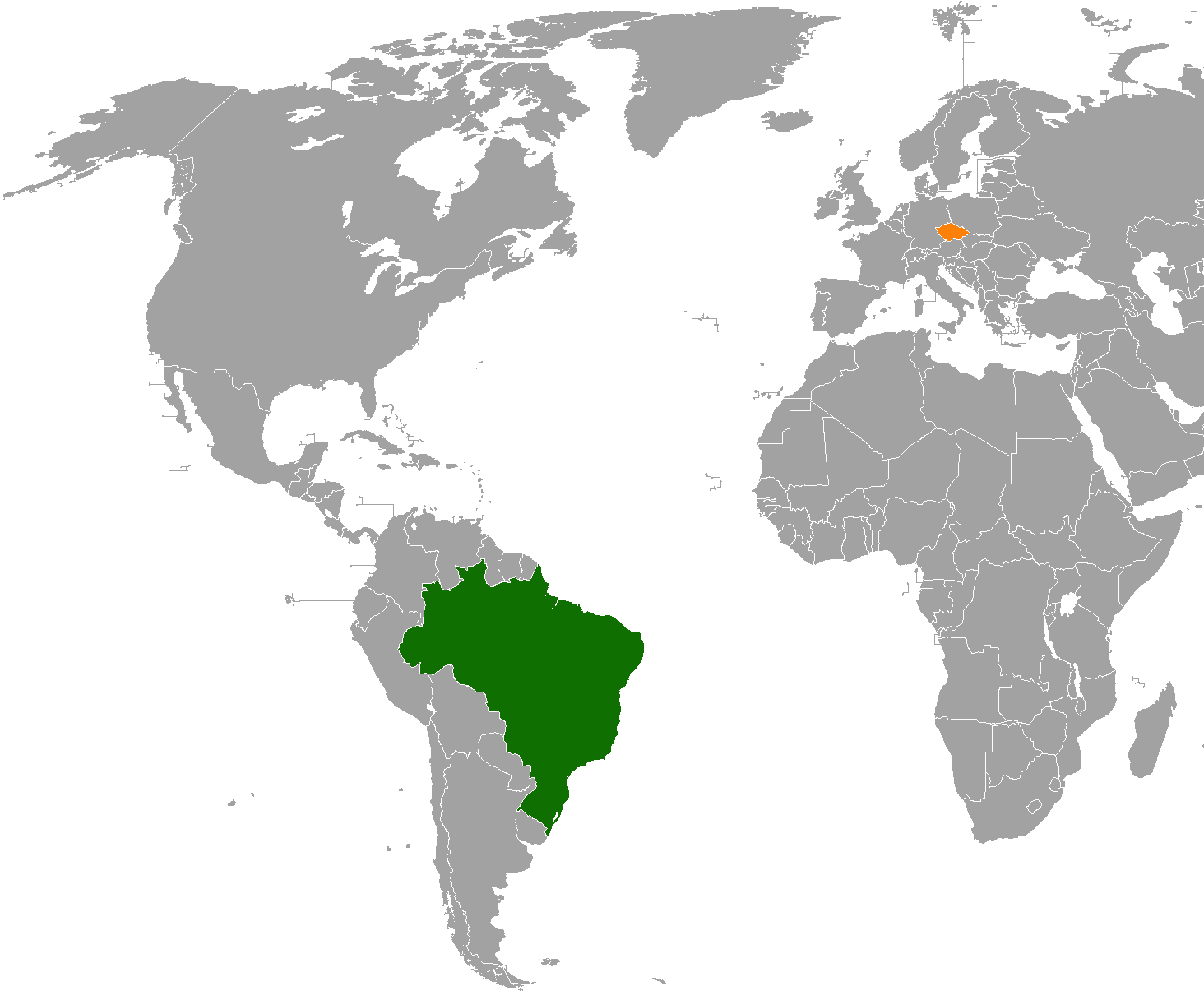
- Brazil: Czech Republic

Brazil–Czech Republic relations are the diplomatic relations between the Federative Republic of Brazil and the Czech Republic. Both nations enjoy friendly relations, the importance of which centers on the history of Czech migration to Brazil. Approximately 500 thousand Brazilians have Czech ancestry. Brazil has an embassy in Prague, while the Czech Republic has an embassy in Brasília, and a consulate-general in São Paulo. Both nations are members of the United Nations.

== History ==
The first Czechs to arrive to Colonial Brazil were Jesuits who arrived to the country to spread Catholicism in the country. In 1823, the first wave of Czech migrants arrived to Brazil, with most settling in the southern parts of the country. Czech immigrant and head of the Bata company, Jan Antonín Baťa, founded several towns throughout southern Brazil.

At the end of World War I, Brazil and newly created Czechoslovakia (which included present day Czech Republic and Slovakia) established diplomatic relations in 1918. In 1920, Czechoslovakia opened a diplomatic legation in Rio de Janeiro and in 1921, Brazil opened a diplomatic legation in Prague. In March 1939, diplomatic relations were interrupted between both nations with the arrival of the Nazis in Prague and the creation of the Protectorate of Bohemia and Moravia. Czechoslovakia also had to hand over its embassy in Rio de Janeiro to the Germans. During World War II, Brazilian and Czechoslovak soldiers fought alongside each other in the Italian Campaign. In 1942, diplomatic relations were re-established between Brazil and the Czechoslovak government-in-exile based in London. Between 1940 and 1950, a second wave of Czech migrants arrived to Brazil, settling mostly in the central western parts of the country.

In 1956, Juscelino Kubitschek was elected President of Brazil, the first of Czech origin. In 1960, both nations elevated their diplomatic missions to the status of embassies. In 1988, Prime Minister Lubomír Štrougal became the first Czechoslovak head-of-state to visit Brazil. In 1990, President Fernando Collor de Mello became the first Brazilian head-of-state to visit Czechoslovakia. In 1993, Czechoslovakia split into the two sovereign states of the Czech Republic and Slovakia, known as the "Velvet Divorce". In 1994, Czech Prime Minister Václav Klaus paid the first official visit to Brazil since the dissolution of Czechoslovakia. Since then, there have been several high level meeting between leaders of both nations. In January 2019, Czech Prime Minister Andrej Babiš met with Brazilian President Jair Bolsonaro during the World Economic Forum in Davos, Switzerland.

== High-level visits ==
High-level visits from Brazil to Czechoslovakia/Czech Republic

- Foreign Minister Roberto Costa de Abreu Sodré (1989)
- President Fernando Collor de Mello (1990)
- President Luiz Inácio Lula da Silva (2008)

High-level visits from Czechoslovakia/Czech Republic to Brazil

- Prime Minister Lubomír Štrougal (1988)
- Prime Minister Václav Klaus (1994)
- Foreign Minister Josef Zieleniec (1995)
- President Václav Havel (1996, 2009)
- Foreign Minister Jiří Šedivý (1998)
- Foreign Minister Jan Kavan (2002)
- Prime Minister Jiří Paroubek (2006)

== Bilateral agreements ==
Both nations have signed a few bilateral agreements such as an Agreement on Trade and Taxes (1931); Agreement for Economic and Industrial Cooperation (2008); Agreement for a Joint Bilateral Committee (2009); Agreement in Defense Cooperation (2010) and a Partnership Agreement between Embraer and Aero Vodochody (2011).

== Trade ==
In 2017, trade between Brazil and the Czech Republic totaled US$600 million. Brazil's main exports to the Czech Republic include: raw materials; ores; meat products; fish and airplanes. Czech Republic's main exports to Brazil include: piston combustion engines and their parts; motor vehicles parts and components; liquid pumps; electric motors and pipes and tubes. Brazil is the Czech Republic's largest trading partner in Latin America. Brazilian multinational company Embraer operates in the Czech Republic.

== Resident diplomatic missions ==
Of Brazil

- Prague (Embassy)

Of Czechia

- Brasília (Embassy)
- São Paulo (Consulate-General)

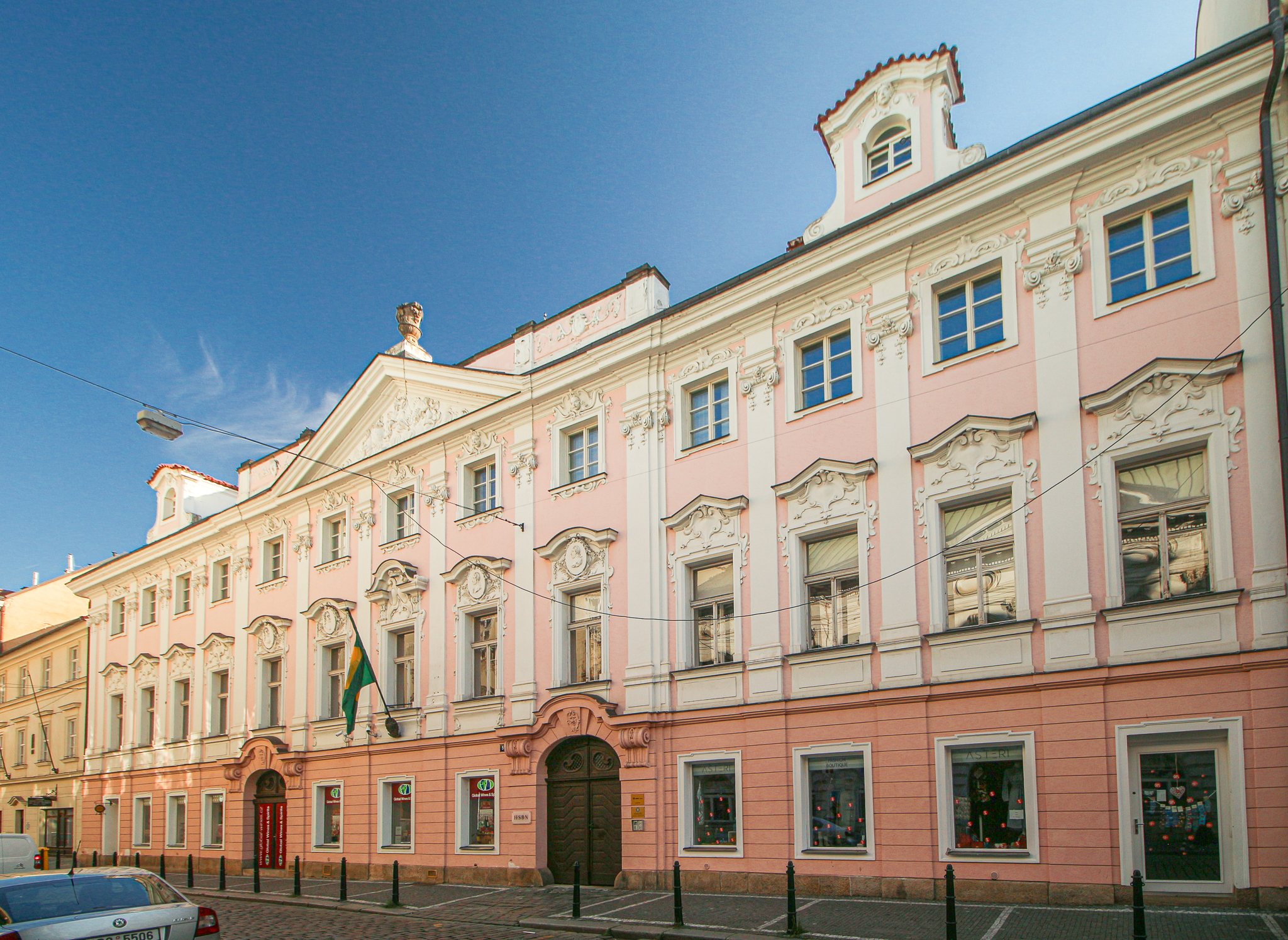
Embassy of Brazil in Prague

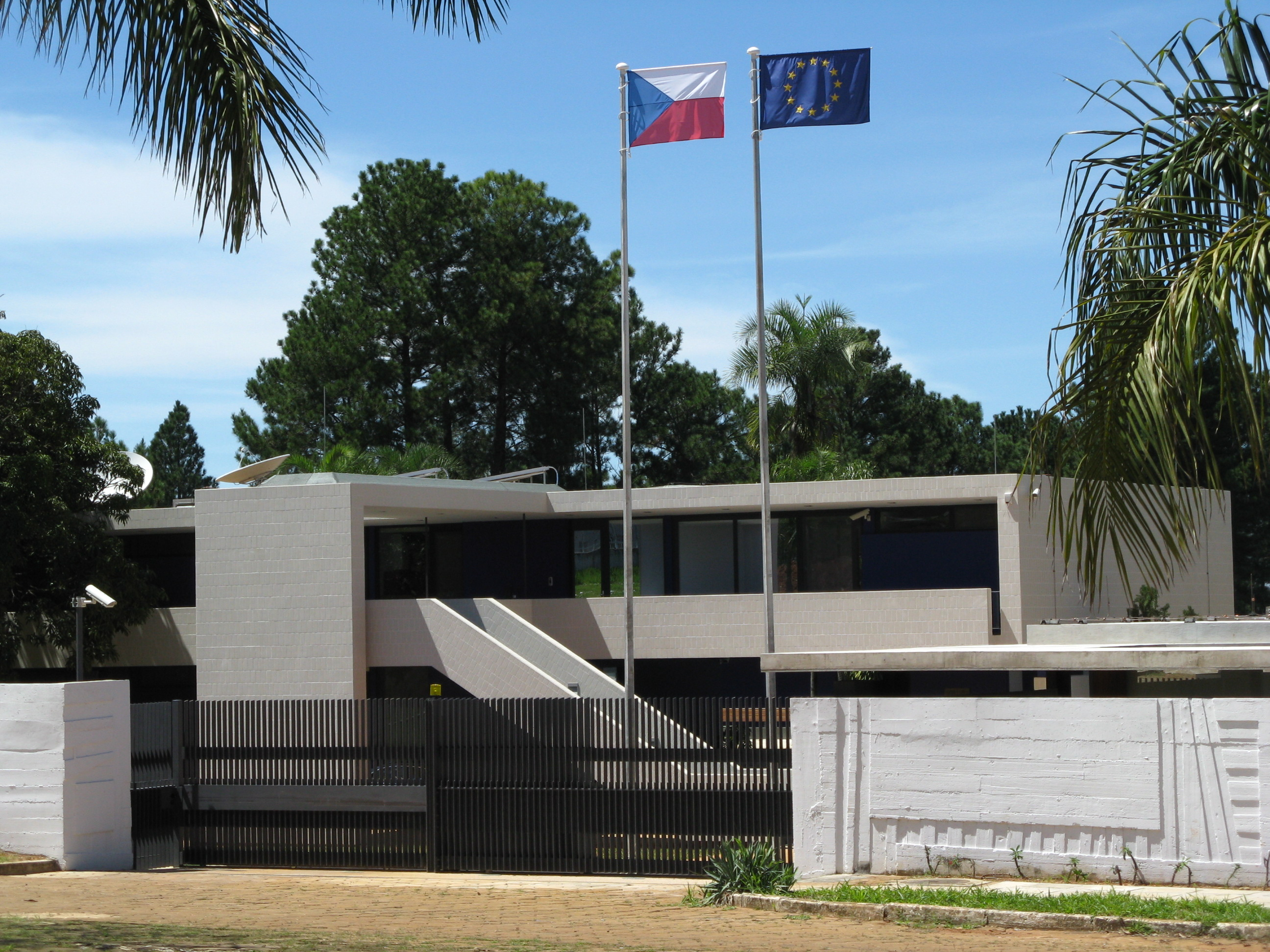
Embassy of Czechia in Brasília

== See also ==
- Czech Brazilians
- Brazilians in the Czech Republic
- Brazil–European Union relations
