= Mariápolis =

- Municipality
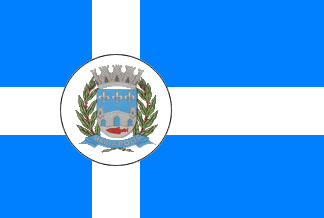
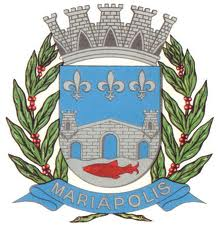
- Flag Coat of arms

- Location in São Paulo state

- Location in Brazil
- Coordinates: 21°47′56″S 51°10′51″W
- Country: Brazil
- Region: Southeast
- State: São Paulo

Area
  - Total: 186.098 km^{2} (71.853 sq mi)

Population (2020)
  - Total: 4,091
  - Density: 21.98/km^{2} (56.94/sq mi)
- Time zone: UTC−3 (BRT)

Mariápolis is a municipality in the state of São Paulo in Brazil. The population is 4,091 (2020 est.) in an area of 187 km^{2}. The elevation is 410 m. The town was founded in 1943 by Jan Antonín Baťa as part of his expansion of the Bata shoe company, founded by his brother Tomáš.

Other towns in Brazil linked to Baťa include Anaurilândia, Batatuba, Bataguassu, and Batayporã.

== See also ==
- List of municipalities in São Paulo
