= Batayporã =

- Municipality
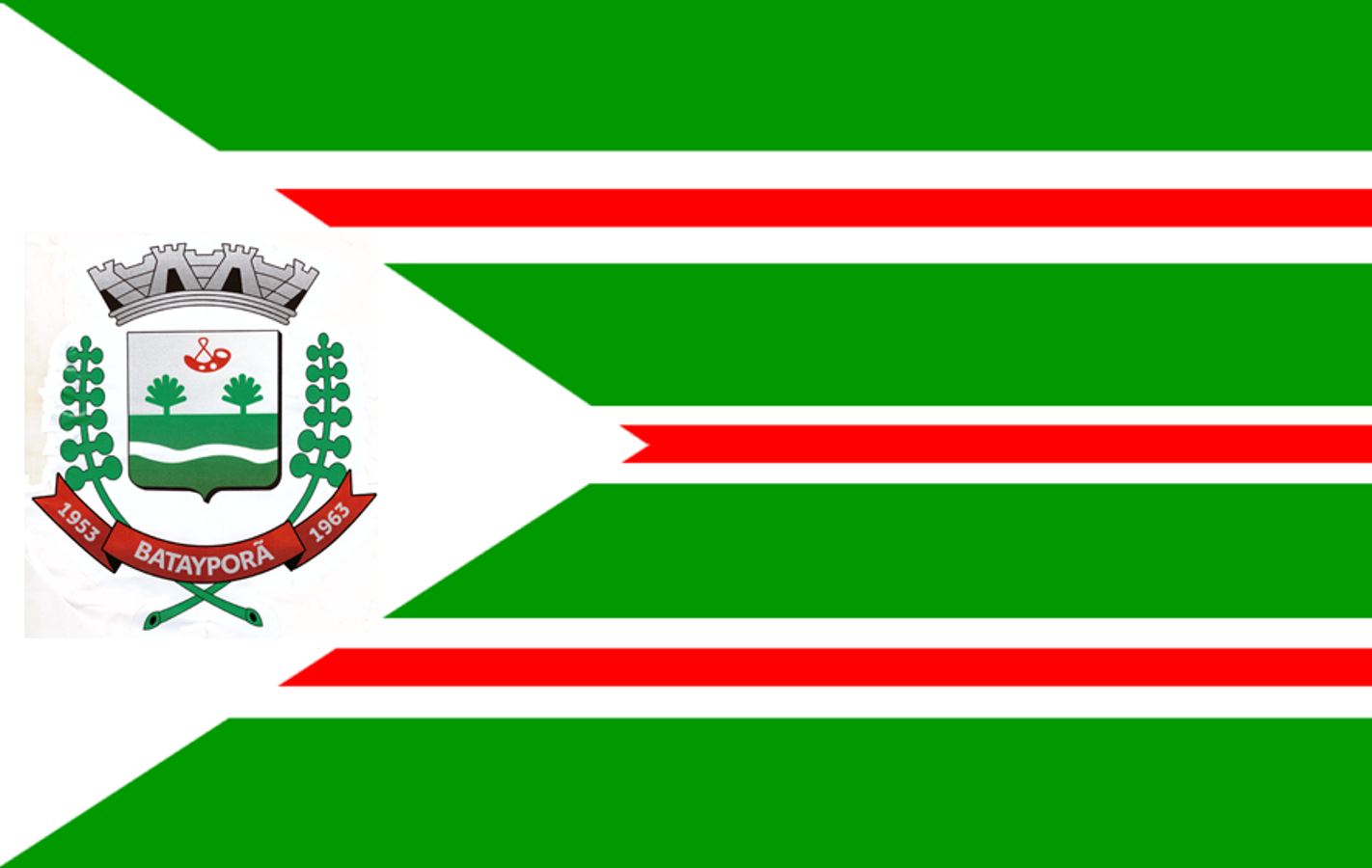
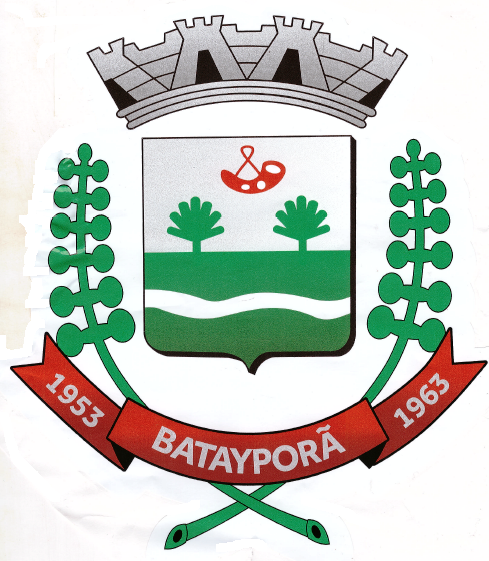
- Flag Coat of arms

- Location in Mato Grosso do Sul state

- Location in Brazil
- Coordinates: 22°17′42″S 53°16′15″W
- Country: Brazil
- Region: Central-West
- State: Mato Grosso do Sul

Area
  - Total: 1,828 km^{2} (706 sq mi)

Population (2020)
  - Total: 11,349
  - Density: 6.208/km^{2} (16.08/sq mi)
- Time zone: UTC−4 (AMT)

Batayporã is a municipality located in the Brazilian state of Mato Grosso do Sul. Its population is 11,349 (2020) and its area is 1,828 km^{2}.

The town was founded in 1954 by Jan Antonín Baťa as part of his expansion of the Bata shoe company, founded by his brother Tomáš.

Batayporã is surrounded by agricultural land. It is located south of Anaurilândia at the junction of MS-395 and MS-134 (BR376), paved single-lane highways.

Other towns in Brazil linked to Baťa include Anaurilândia, Batatuba, Bataguassu, and Mariápolis.
