= Patriots Museum of Brazilian Emigration =

Coordinates: 50°39′42.42″N 14°54′23.24″E

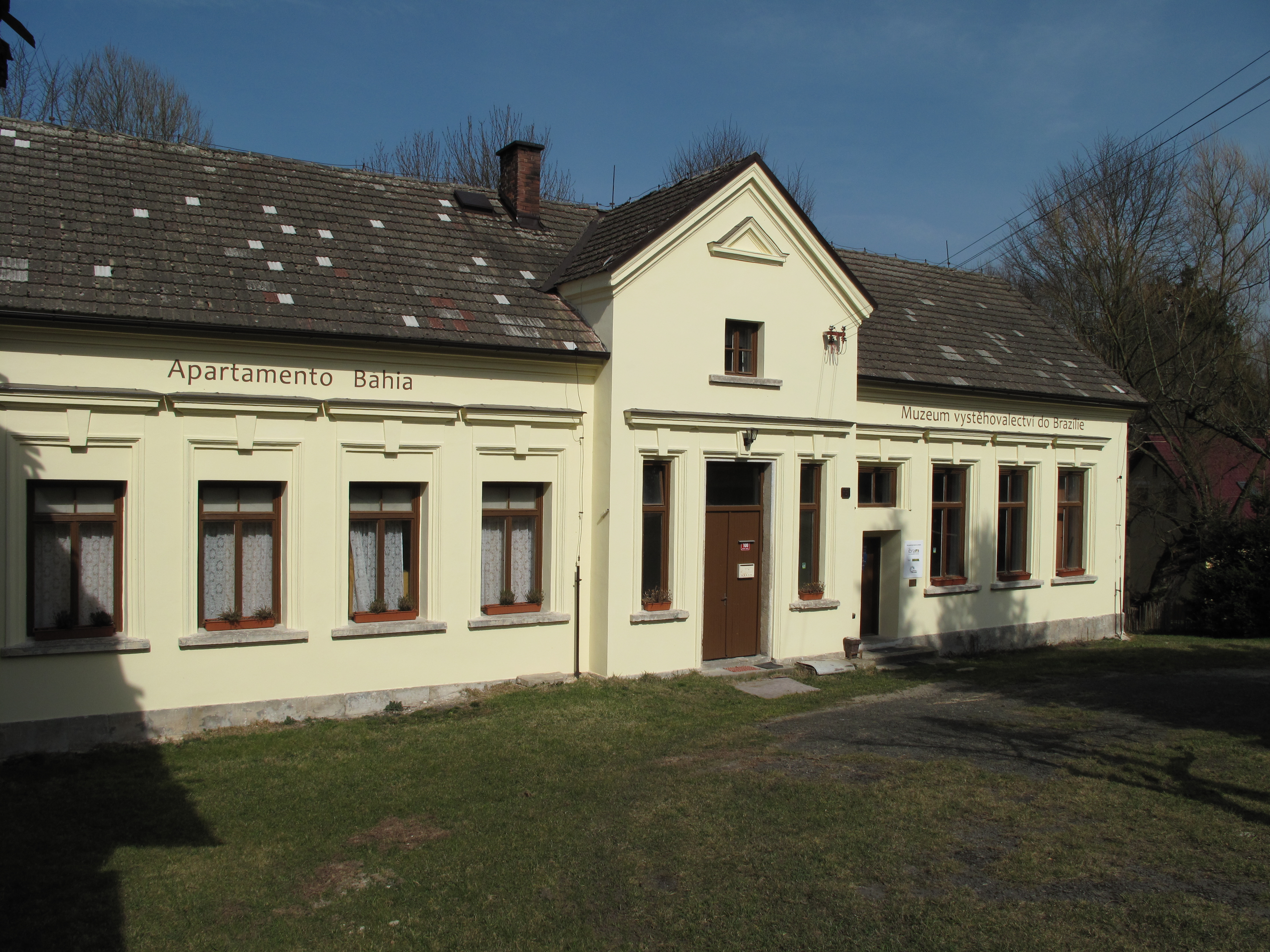
Museum of Brazilian Emigration in Náhlov

The Patriots Museum of Brazilian Emigration (Czech: Krajanské muzeum vystěhovalectví do Brazílie) is a museum located in the village of Náhlov, today a part of the town of Ralsko, Liberec Region, Czech Republic. The museum building was a school during the second half of the 19th century. The museum is operated by the non-government organization Nahlov Association in the Podralsko region and managed by Petr Polakovic.

The Brazilian museum covers the wave of Emigration from Czech Republic into Brazil in the early 19th century and throughout the 20th century. Examples of emigrations include those from Rýmařov and Šumperk into Joinville, from Rozvadov to Sao Bento and from Šumava in Český Les into Santa Catarina. Special recognition will be given to the famous personalities with Czech origin such as J. Kubitschek, J.A. Baťa, and Valdomiro Lorenz.

The exhibits include letters, photographs, and diaries from emigrants from Czech Republic to Brazil. The description will include their journey from Bohemia to Brazil.

== See also ==
- Brazilian diaspora
