= Anaurilândia =

- Municipality
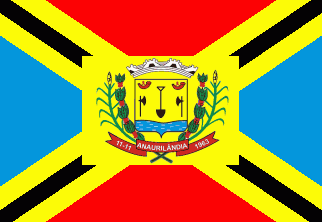
- Flag

- Location in Mato Grosso do Sul state

- Location in Brazil
- Coordinates: 22°11′16″S 52°43′04″W
- Country: Brazil
- Region: Central-West
- State: Mato Grosso do Sul

Area
  - Total: 3,396 km^{2} (1,311 sq mi)

Population (2020)
  - Total: 9,076
  - Density: 2.673/km^{2} (6.922/sq mi)
- Time zone: UTC−4 (AMT)

Anaurilândia is a municipality located in the Brazilian state of Mato Grosso do Sul. Its population is 9,076 (2020) and its area is 3,396 km^{2} (1,311 sq mi). The town was founded by Jan Antonín Baťa as part of his expansion of the Bata shoe company, founded by his brother Tomáš.

Other towns in Brazil linked to Baťa include Mariápolis, Batatuba, Bataguassu, and Batayporã.

Anaurilândia is a small settlement surrounded by agricultural land and lies on the north side of the Rio Parana. MS-395 is a paved single-lane highway that passes through the town and connects it to Batayporã.
