= Bataguassu =

- Municipality
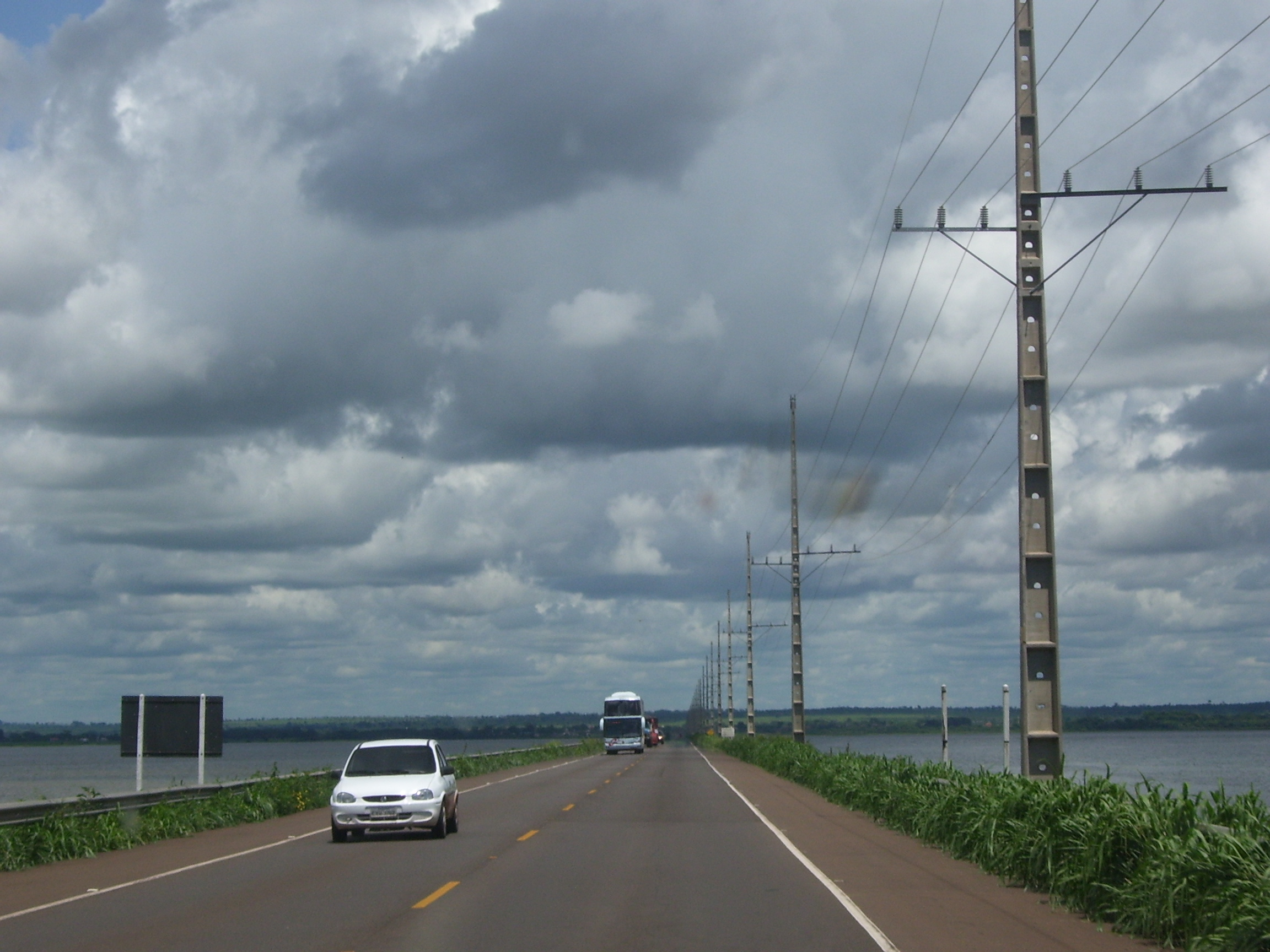
- Region of the embankment of the Paraná River on the border MS-SP.

- Flag Coat of arms

- Location in Mato Grosso do Sul state

- Location in Brazil
- Coordinates: 21°42′50″S 52°25′19″W
- Country: Brazil
- Region: Central-West
- State: Mato Grosso do Sul

Area
  - Total: 2,417 km^{2} (933 sq mi)

Population (2020)
  - Total: 23,325
  - Density: 9.650/km^{2} (24.99/sq mi)
- Time zone: UTC−4 (AMT)
- Postal code: 79780-000
- Area code: +55 67

Bataguassu is a municipality in the Brazilian state of Mato Grosso do Sul. In 2020, its population was 23,325. Its area is 2,417 km^{2} (933 sq mi). The town was founded in 1932 by Jan Antonín Baťa as part of his expansion of the Bata shoe company, founded by his brother Tomáš.

Other towns in Brazil linked to Baťa include Anaurilândia, Batatuba, Mariápolis, and Batayporã.
