= São Bento do Sul =

Municipality of Santa Catarina, Brazil

Coordinates: 26°15′S 49°23′W

- Municipality
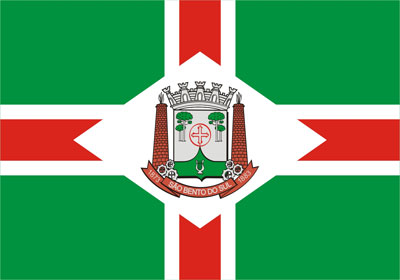
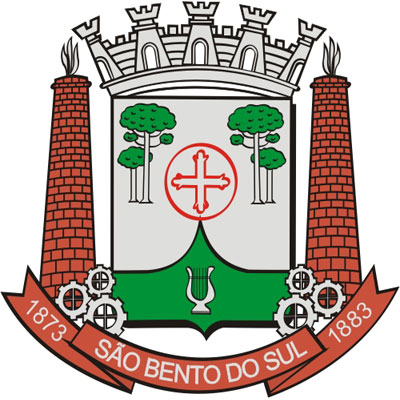
- Flag Coat of arms
- Interactive map of São Bento do Sul
- Country: Brazil
- Time zone: UTC−3 (BRT)

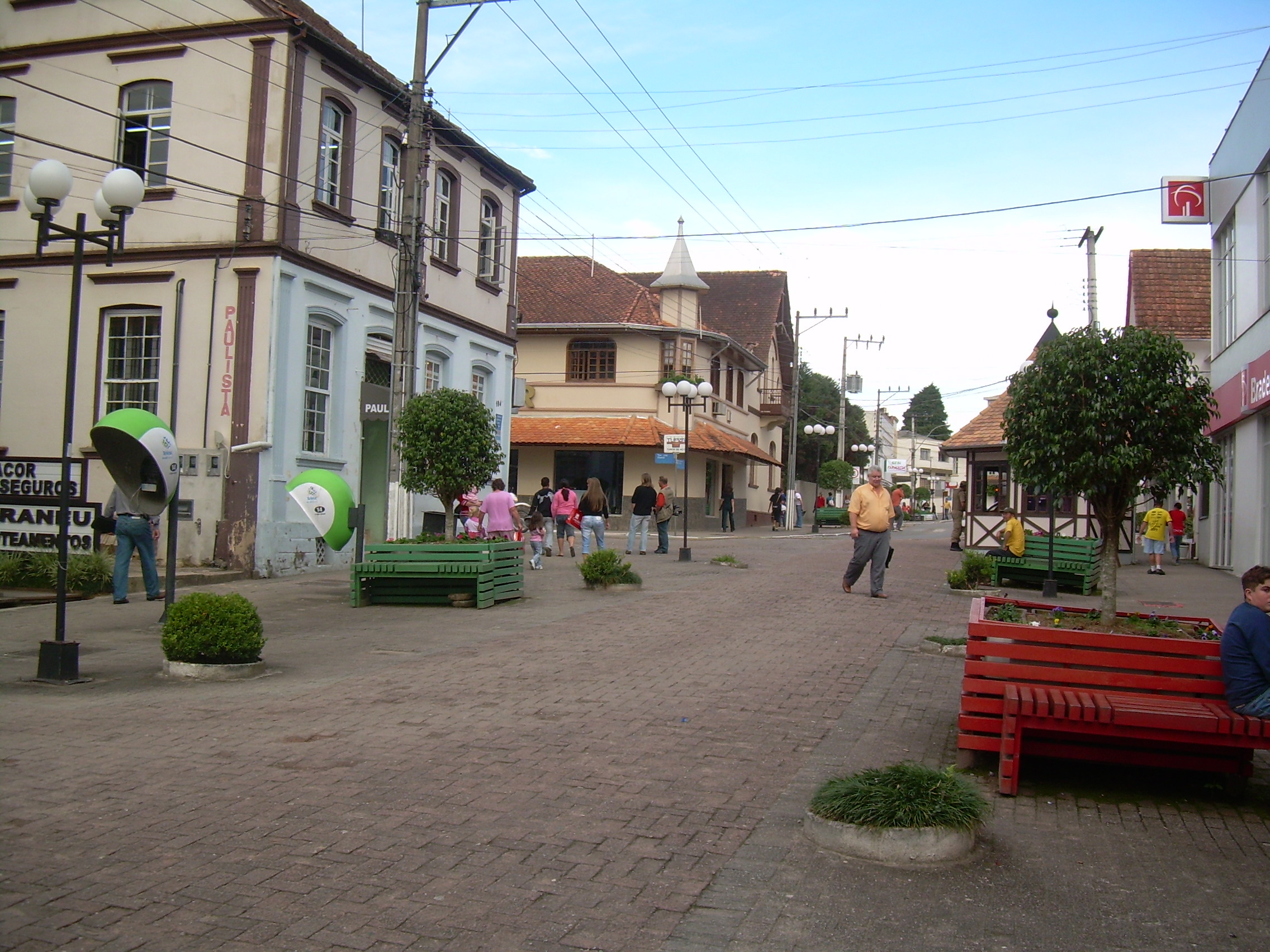
This is São Bento do Sul's downtown area. The two green telephone booths that appear in this picture are called orelhão in Portuguese; these public phones can be found throughout Brazil.

São Bento do Sul is a municipality, pop. 85,421 (2020) located in southern Brazil, in the northeast part of the state of Santa Catarina, just south of the state of Paraná.

== Industry ==
São Bento do Sul is considered to be an industrialized city.

There are many strong industries active in the region but the municipality is best known for its production of furniture and textiles.

== Pioneer days ==
São Bento do Sul was first settled by the Kolonisations Verein von 1849, in Hamburg, a 'for profit' colonization enterprise (as opposed to the State of provincial colonization efforts that were also taking place at that time) established in Hamburg, Germany.

Today there are different festivals celebrating the local population's immigrant roots: German, Italian, Polish, Czech, and others.

== Climate ==
Climate data for São Bento do Sul, elevation 850 m (2,790 ft), (1976–2005)
Month	Jan	Feb	Mar	Apr	May	Jun	Jul	Aug	Sep	Oct	Nov	Dec	Year
Record high °C (°F)	35.0 (95.0)	34.0 (93.2)	33.0 (91.4)	30.7 (87.3)	28.0 (82.4)	26.2 (79.2)	28.0 (82.4)	30.0 (86.0)	32.0 (89.6)	32.0 (89.6)	33.8 (92.8)	33.3 (91.9)	35.0 (95.0)
Mean daily maximum °C (°F)	26.6 (79.9)	27.3 (81.1)	24.8 (76.6)	22.6 (72.7)	21.2 (70.2)	19.8 (67.6)	20.1 (68.2)	19.8 (67.6)	19.6 (67.3)	22.6 (72.7)	23.9 (75.0)	25.1 (77.2)	22.8 (73.0)
Daily mean °C (°F)	20.2 (68.4)	20.8 (69.4)	19.2 (66.6)	16.4 (61.5)	13.8 (56.8)	12.2 (54.0)	12.8 (55.0)	12.9 (55.2)	14.6 (58.3)	15.7 (60.3)	17.9 (64.2)	19.2 (66.6)	16.3 (61.4)
Mean daily minimum °C (°F)	16.1 (61.0)	16.6 (61.9)	15.5 (59.9)	12.3 (54.1)	9.3 (48.7)	9.3 (48.7)	7.5 (45.5)	7.8 (46.0)	8.2 (46.8)	9.3 (48.7)	11.6 (52.9)	15.0 (59.0)	11.5 (52.8)
Record low °C (°F)	6.3 (43.3)	9.0 (48.2)	9.0 (48.2)	−1.1 (30.0)	−4.3 (24.3)	−7.0 (19.4)	−4.9 (23.2)	−4.7 (23.5)	−3.3 (26.1)	−0.4 (31.3)	5.0 (41.0)	5.2 (41.4)	−7.0 (19.4)
Average precipitation mm (inches)	172.9 (6.81)	168.5 (6.63)	123.1 (4.85)	90.9 (3.58)	129.0 (5.08)	115.9 (4.56)	123.1 (4.85)	95.1 (3.74)	131.7 (5.19)	136.6 (5.38)	122.8 (4.83)	145.0 (5.71)	1,554.6 (61.21)
Average relative humidity (%)	84	87	88	86	89	88	87	86	85	85	83	85	86
Mean monthly sunshine hours	160	135	124	107	125	133	128	130	122	146	139	130	1,579
Source: Empresa Brasileira de Pesquisa Agropecuária (EMBRAPA)

== See also ==
- Czech Brazilian
- Telephone booth
