= Batapur =

Town in Punjab, Pakistan

Coordinates: 31°35′39″N 74°29′37″E

- Residential area
- Country: Pakistan
- Province: Punjab
- District & city: Lahore
- Code: 042
- Language: Punjabi; Urdu; English

Batapur is a town near the city of Lahore, Pakistan. It was established as a residence for the workers of a Bata shoe factory. The nearest airport is the Allama Iqbal International Airport in Lahore, an approximately 20-minute drive on the Lahore Ring Road.
