= Łukasz Kubik =

Polish footballer

Personal information
- Date of birth: 2 April 1978 (age 48)
- Place of birth: Kraków, Poland
- Height: 1.81 m (5 ft 11 in)
- Position: Midfielder

Team information
- Current team: Cedronka Wola Radziszowska
- Number: 4

Youth career
- Cracovia

Senior career*
Years	Team	Apps	(Gls)
1997–1998	Cracovia	56	(4)
1998–2001	Harelbeke	77	(5)
2001–2002	Mechelen	48	(5)
2003	Mouscron	12	(1)
2003	Cracovia	10	(0)
2004	Argeş Piteşti	9	(0)
2004–2005	Levadiakos	26	(0)
2005	Jagiellonia Białystok	9	(0)
2006	Lechia Gdańsk	3	(0)
2006	O.F. Ierapetra	16	(2)
2007	Odra Opole	35	(2)
2008	Polonia Słubice	8	(0)
2008–2009	Zwierzyniecki KS Kraków		
2009–2010	Bronowianka Kraków		
2011	Kalwarianka Kalwaria Z.		
2011–2019	Bronowianka Kraków		
2020–2022	Cedronka Wola Radziszowska	32	(7)
2023	Wanda Kraków	5	(0)
2023–	Cedronka Wola Radziszowska	33	(6)

Managerial career
- 2018–2020: Bronowianka Kraków (player-manager)
- 2020–2025: Wieczysta Kraków II
- * Club domestic league appearances and goals as of 20:24, 24 June 2025 (UTC)

Łukasz Kubik (born 2 April 1978) is a Polish football manager and player who plays as a midfielder for Cedronka Wola Radziszowska. His brother, Arkadiusz, was also a footballer.

== Managerial statistics ==
As of match played 14 June 2025

Managerial record by team and tenure
Team	From	To	Record							
Team	From	To	G	W	D	L	GF	GA	GD	Win %
Bronowianka Kraków	14 December 2018	30 June 2020	27	12	5	10	56	54	+2	44.44
Wieczysta Kraków II	1 July 2020	30 June 2025	164	131	16	17	894	182	+712	79.88
Total			191	143	21	27	950	236	+714	74.87

== Honours ==
=== Managerial ===
Wieczysta Kraków

- V liga Lesser Poland West: 2023–24
- Regional league Kraków II: 2022–23
- Klasa A Kraków III: 2021–22
- Klasa B Kraków III: 2020–21
- Polish Cup (Kraków District regionals): 2022–23
