= Arkadiusz Kubik =

Polish footballer

Personal information
- Date of birth: 31 May 1972 (age 54)
- Place of birth: Kraków, Poland
- Height: 1.77 m (5 ft 10 in)
- Position: Midfielder

Youth career
- Cracovia

Senior career*
Years	Team	Apps	(Gls)
1991–1992	Cracovia		
1992–1995	Górnik Zabrze	106	(11)
1995–2001	Harelbeke	127	(9)
2001	Zagłębie Lubin	4	(0)
2002–2004	Royal Antwerp	36	(2)
2004–2005	Widzew Łódź	27	(2)
2005–2006	Jagiellonia Białystok	30	(3)
2007–2009	Górnik Wieliczka	39	(4)
2009–2010	Bronowianka Kraków		
2010–2017	Dąb Paszkówka		
2017–2022	Cedronka Wola Radziszowska	26	(1)

International career
1994	Poland	2	(0)
- * Club domestic league appearances and goals

Arkadiusz Kubik (born 31 May 1972) is a Polish former professional footballer who played as a midfielder. His brother, Łukasz, is also a footballer. Besides Poland, he has played in Belgium.

== Honours ==
Dąb Paszkówka

- Klasa A Wadowice: 2013–14
