= Valentin Stansel =

Czech astronomer (1621–1705)

Valentin Stansel or Stanzel
- Born: 1621; Olomouc, Moravia, Kingdom of Bohemia
- Died: December 18, 1705 (aged 83–84); Bahia, Brazil
- Education: University of Olomouc
- Scientific career
- Fields: Mathematics, astronomy
- Workplaces: University of Olomouc; Charles University; University of Évora

Valentin Stansel or Stanzel (1621 – 18 December 1705) was a Czech Jesuit astronomer who worked in Brazil.

== Biography ==
Valentin Stanzel was born to a German family in Olomouc, Moravia. He entered the Society of Jesus on 1 October 1637, and taught rhetoric and mathematics at University of Olomouc and in Prague. After being ordained, he requested an appointment to the Jesuit mission in India, and went to Portugal to await an opportunity of taking ship for his destination. Meantime, he lectured on astronomy at the college of Évora. While there, in order to conform to the language of the country, he changed his name to the form "Estancel", in which form it appears on the title pages of most of his published works.

He was unable to procure passage to India, traveling instead to Brazil, where he was attached to the Jesuit College and Seminary of Salvador, Bahia, as professor of Moral Theology. He also later served as the institution's Superior. At the same time he continued his astronomical work, and made extensive observations, particularly on comets, the results of which he was sending to Europe for publication.

On 5 March 1668 Valentin Stanzel discovered a bright comet. His observations of the comet of 1668 are mentioned in Newton's Principia.

Valentin Stanzel died in Salvador, Bahia, Brazil.

== Chief works ==
- Dioptra geodetica (Prague, 1652 or 1654)
- Propositiones selenegraphicæ, sive de luna (Olmütz, 1655)
- Orbe Affonsino, horoscopio universal (Évora, 1658)
- Mercurius brasilicus, sive de Coeli et soli brasiliensis oeconomia
- Zodiacus Divini Doloris, sive Orationes XII (Évora, 1675)
- Legatus uranicus ex orbe novo in veterum, h. e. Observationes Americanæ cometarum factæ, concriptæ et in Europam missæ (Prague, 1683)
- Uranophilus coelestis peregrinus, sive mentis Uranicæ per mundum sidereum peregrinantis ecstases (Antwerp and Ghent, 1685)
- Mercurius Brasilicus, sive Cœli et soli brasiliensis oeconomica

== See also ==
- List of Jesuit scientists
- List of Roman Catholic scientist-clerics
