= Jan Antonín Baťa =

Czech shoe manufacturer (1898–1965)

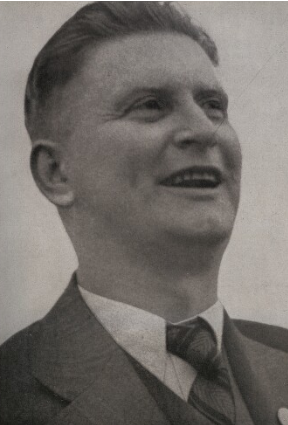
- Baťa in 1933
- Born: 7 March 1898; Uherské Hradiště, Moravia, Austro-Hungarian Empire
- Died: 23 August 1965 (aged 67); Batatuba, São Paulo, Brazil
- Occupation: Businessman

Jan Antonín Baťa (7 March 1898 – 23 August 1965) (also known as Jan Antonin Bata or Jan Bata, called the King of Shoes) was a Czech-Brazilian shoe manufacturer from Uherské Hradiště (southeastern Moravia) and a half-brother of Tomáš Baťa.

== Biography ==
Together with American experts, he participated in the First Prague International Management Congress (PIMCO) in July 1924, organized by the Masaryk Academy of Labour.

After the 1932 death of his half-brother Tomáš, who had founded the company, Jan Antonin became the head of Bata Corporation which had been converted to a joint stock company, Baťa a.s., a year prior, and was based in Zlín. At the time, the organization employed 16,560 workers that maintained 1,645 shops and 25 enterprises. Most of it was located in Czech lands (15,770 employees, 1,500 shops, 25 enterprises) and Slovak lands (2 enterprises, 250 employees). International divisions consisted of 790 employees, 132 shops, and 20 enterprises.

Jan Antonín Baťa implemented new growth plans for the businesses at the height of the Great Depression. His efforts included expansion into new industries, including shoe production machinery, tires, textiles, chemicals, mines, canals, a railway, film studios, manufacture of airplanes and bicycles, development of retail department stores, and import/export. During his period, the Czech part of the business more than doubled in size.

In 1939, when Bohemia and Moravia were annexed by Nazi Germany, Baťa unsuccessfully tried to negotiate with the German authorities to prevent the control of his company from being taken over. He subsequently took his family into exile to the United States. In 1941, he was blacklisted for having entered into negotiations with the Nazis and was exiled again, settling finally in Brazil. There, he founded several industrial towns, including Batayporã, Bataguassu, Batatuba, Anaurilândia, and Mariápolis, all of which still exist to the present day.

Baťa expanded the shoe company more than sixfold from the date of acquisition until his death in 1965.
