= Vladimir Kubik =

Brazilian manager

Vladimir Kubik was the manager of the Companhia Viação São Paulo-Mato Grosso, which was responsible for the colonisation of some areas in the state of Mato Grosso do Sul, Brazil.
