= František Lorenz =

Czech-born Brazilian polyglot and philosopher

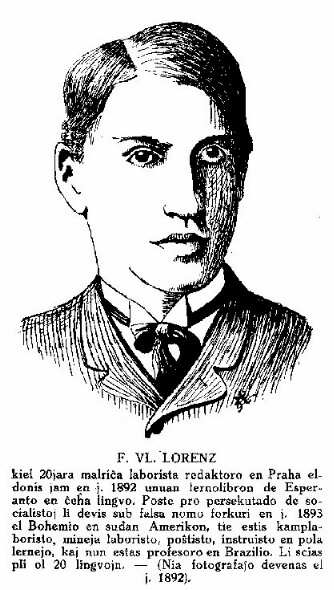
- Born: František Vladimir Lorenc; December 24, 1872; Zbyslavice, Czech Republic
- Died: May 24, 1957 (aged 84); Dom Feliciano, Rio Grande do Sul, Brazil
- Other names: Francisco Valdomiro Lorenz

František Vladimír Lorenc (24 December 1872 – 24 May 1957), known in Portuguese as Francisco Valdomiro Lorenz, was a Czech-born polyglot and philosopher born in Zbyslavice (nowadays part of the Czech Republic). He was one of the first Esperantists in the world, and was able to communicate in over 100 different languages. Lorenz was persecuted by the Austro-Hungarian monarchy due to his involvement with Esperanto, which was associated with socialist revolutionary movements in the region, and he subsequently moved to Brazil as a political refugee in 1891. In Brazil, he lived in Rio de Janeiro at first, and then in Rio Grande do Sul (Southern Brazil). Lorenz published over 36 books in 40 languages and was one of the most prominent promoters of Esperanto movement ever in Brazil. He died in Dom Feliciano (Brazil) in 1957.
