= Piracaia =

Municipality in São Paulo, Brazil

- Municipality
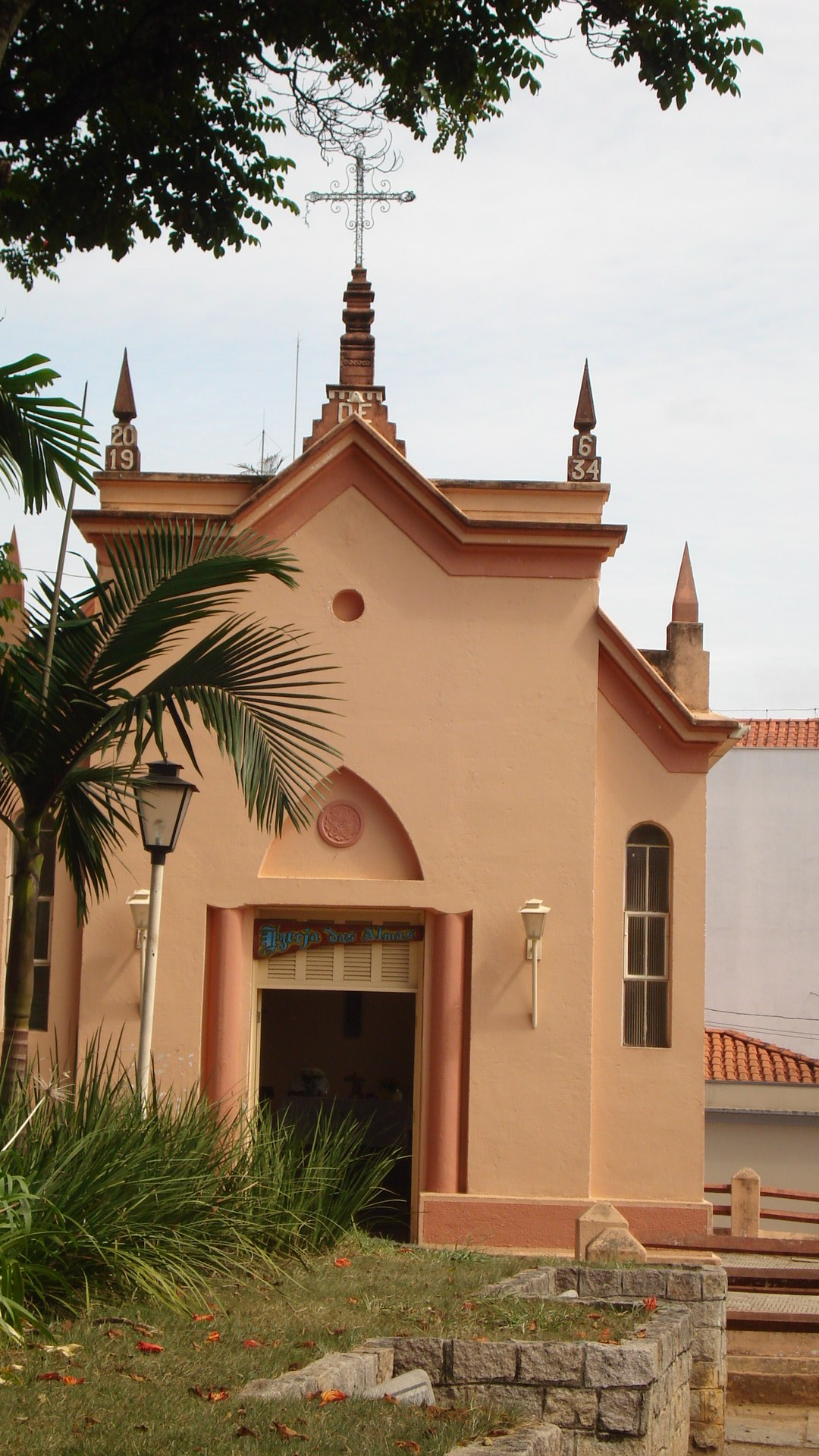
- Igreja das Almas in Piracaia

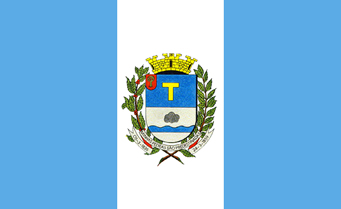
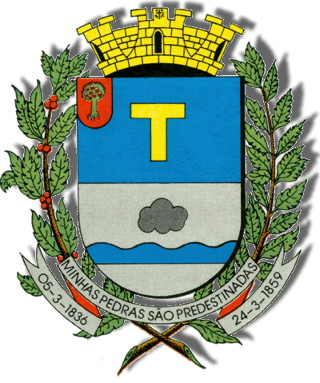
- Flag Coat of arms

- Location in São Paulo state

- Location in Brazil
- Coordinates: 23°3′14″S 46°21′29″W
- Country: Brazil
- Region: Southeast
- State: São Paulo

Government
  - Mayor: André Henrique Rogério

Area
  - Total: 385.64 km^{2} (148.90 sq mi)

Population (2022 census)
  - Total: 26,029
  - Estimate (2025): 26,795
  - Density: 67.496/km^{2} (174.81/sq mi)
- Demonym: Piracaiense
- Time zone: UTC−3 (BRT)
- HDI (2010): 0.739
- Website: piracaia.sp.gov.br

Piracaia is a municipality in the state of São Paulo in Brazil. According to the 2022 Brazilian census, it had a population of 26,029, a population density of 67.51 inhabitants per square kilometre, and an area of 385.64 km^{2} (148.90 sq mi); its population was estimated at 26,795 in 2025. The municipality was created in 1859 as Santo Antônio da Cachoeira, and its name was changed to Piracaia on 20 August 1906.

== Media ==
In telecommunications, the city was served by Companhia Telefônica Brasileira until 1973, when Telecomunicações de São Paulo took over.

== See also ==
- List of municipalities in São Paulo
