= Sabrina Soussan =

French-German engineer

Sabrina Soussan (born 1969 in Paris) is an engineer and manager of French and German nationality. Until 31 December 2021, Soussan has been CEO of dormakaba Holding AG, a global group in the access industry based in Switzerland. She took her new position of Chief Executive Officer of SUEZ on 1 February 2022. She was appointed chairman and CEO on 1 August 2022.

== Early life and education ==
Soussan studied mechanical and aeronautical engineering at the École Nationale Supérieure de Mécanique et d'Aérotechnique in Poitiers, France, and received her master's degree in 1992. In 1993, she completed her Masters of Business Administration (MBA) from the Université de Poitiers in France and Trinity College Dublin in Ireland.

== Career ==
Soussan began her career at Renault in Paris as an engineer in engine research and development in 1994. From 1997 onwards, she worked in various positions at Siemens Automotive/Siemens VDO, first as project director for gasoline and diesel systems for Ford projects, then as managing director for diesel systems for the Renault-Nissan business unit, a position she initially kept after Siemens sold its Siemens VDO division to Continental.

=== Siemens, 2009–2021 ===
In 2009, Soussan returned to Siemens as Head of Strategy and Marketing for Building Automation for the Building Technologies Division in Switzerland. In 2011, she became Vice President Sustainability and Energy Management in the same division before moving to the Mobility Division of Siemens in 2013, first as Vice President Commuter and Regional Trains, then as CEO of the Rolling Stock Business Unit in 2015 and as Co-CEO of Siemens Mobility, a company offering transportation solutions, from 2017 onwards.

=== dormakaba, 2021–2022 ===
In April 2021, Sabrina Soussan left Siemens to succeed Riet Cadonau as CEO at dormakaba Holding AG, a global group in the access industry based in Switzerland, as of 1 April 2021. She held this position until 31 December 2021.

=== Suez, 2022–present ===
In 22 August Soussan was appointed chairman and CEO of SUEZ SA. She joined about a year after the company was merged with rival Veolia following a much-publicized hostile takeover bid.

== Other activities ==
- Boeing, Member-elect of the board of directors (since 2023)
- SUEZ, Chairman of the board of directors (since 2022)
- ITT Inc, Member of the board of directors (2018-2023)
- Schaeffler AG, Member of the supervisory board(2019–2021)
