= Otrokovice railway station =

Railway station in Otrokovice, Czech Republic

Coordinates: 49.2026°N 17.5317°E

Otrokovice
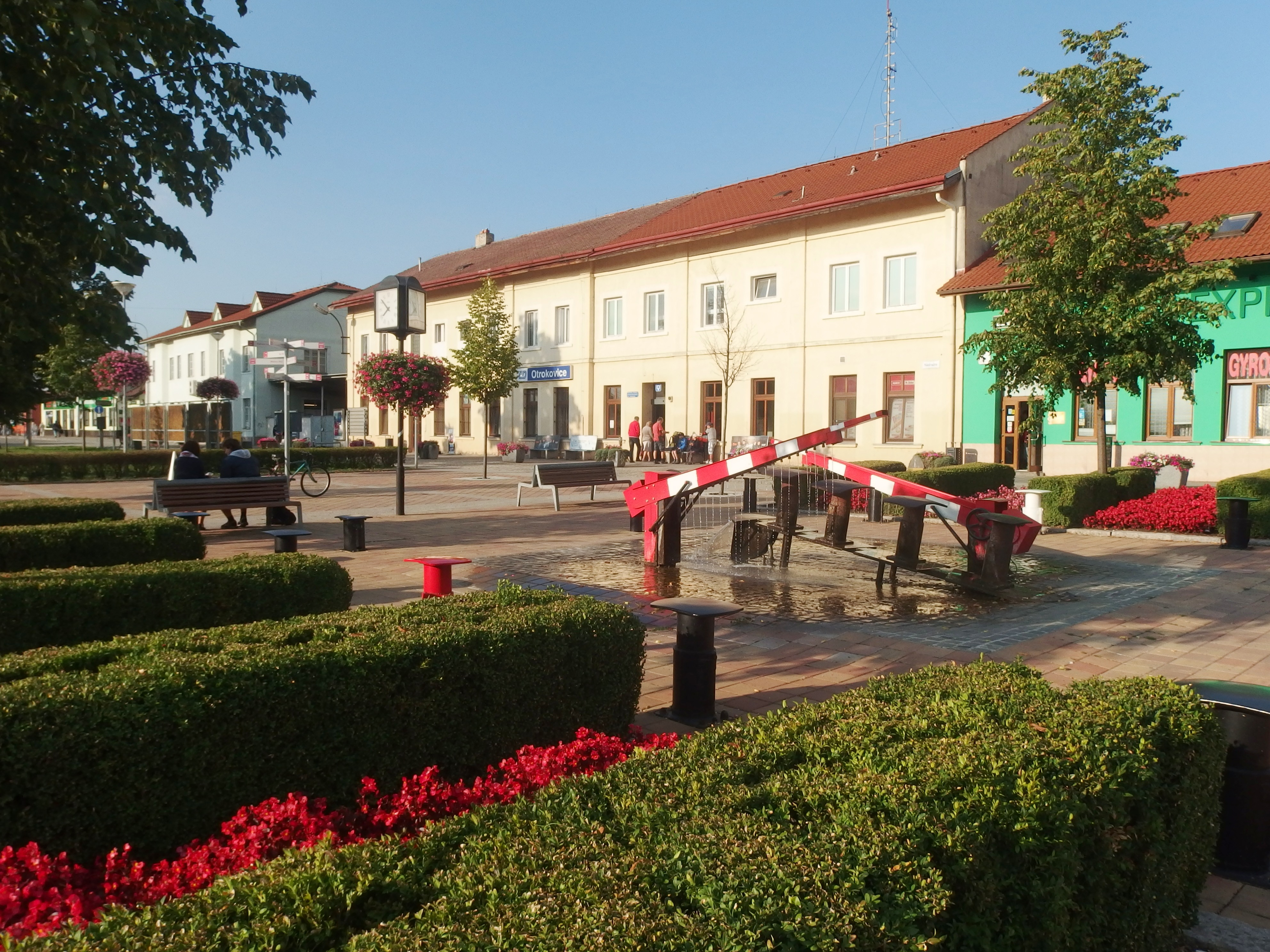
- Main entrance to the station

General information
- Location: Nádražní 272, 765 02 Otrokovice; Czech Republic
- Owner: Czech Republic
- Lines: Břeclav - Přerov (330); Otrokovice - Vizovice (331)
- Platforms: 3 (5)

Other information
- Station code: 54355750

History
- Opened: 18 July 1841; 185 years ago
- Electrified: 1984
Location

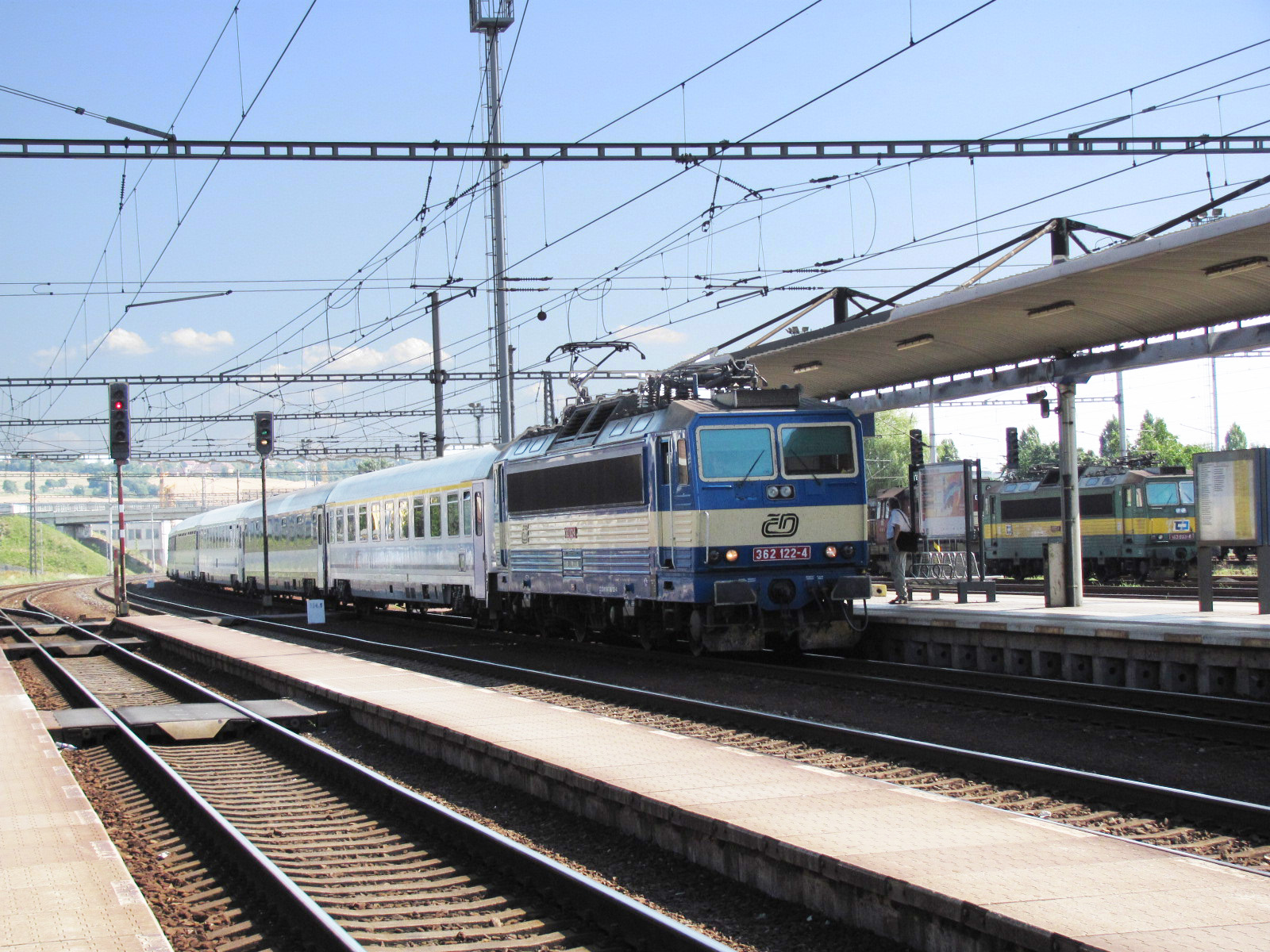
Platforms at Otrokovice railway station

Otrokovice railway station (Czech: Otrokovice) is a railway station in Otrokovice in the Czech Republic. It is a mainline railway station situated on an international corridor linking Austria and Slovakia with Poland, and serves the wider Zlín metropolitan area; the more centrally located Zlín střed railway station is located on an unelectrified line, and is served almost entirely by local trains. Otrokovice station is served by trains operated by Czech Railways, Arriva and Leo Express.

The station is situated adjacent to a Continental Tyres factory. It is connected to Zlín's trolleybus network.
