= Trolleybuses in Zlín and Otrokovice =

Trolleybus system in Zlín and Otrokovice, Czech Republic

Zlín and Otrokovice trolleybuses
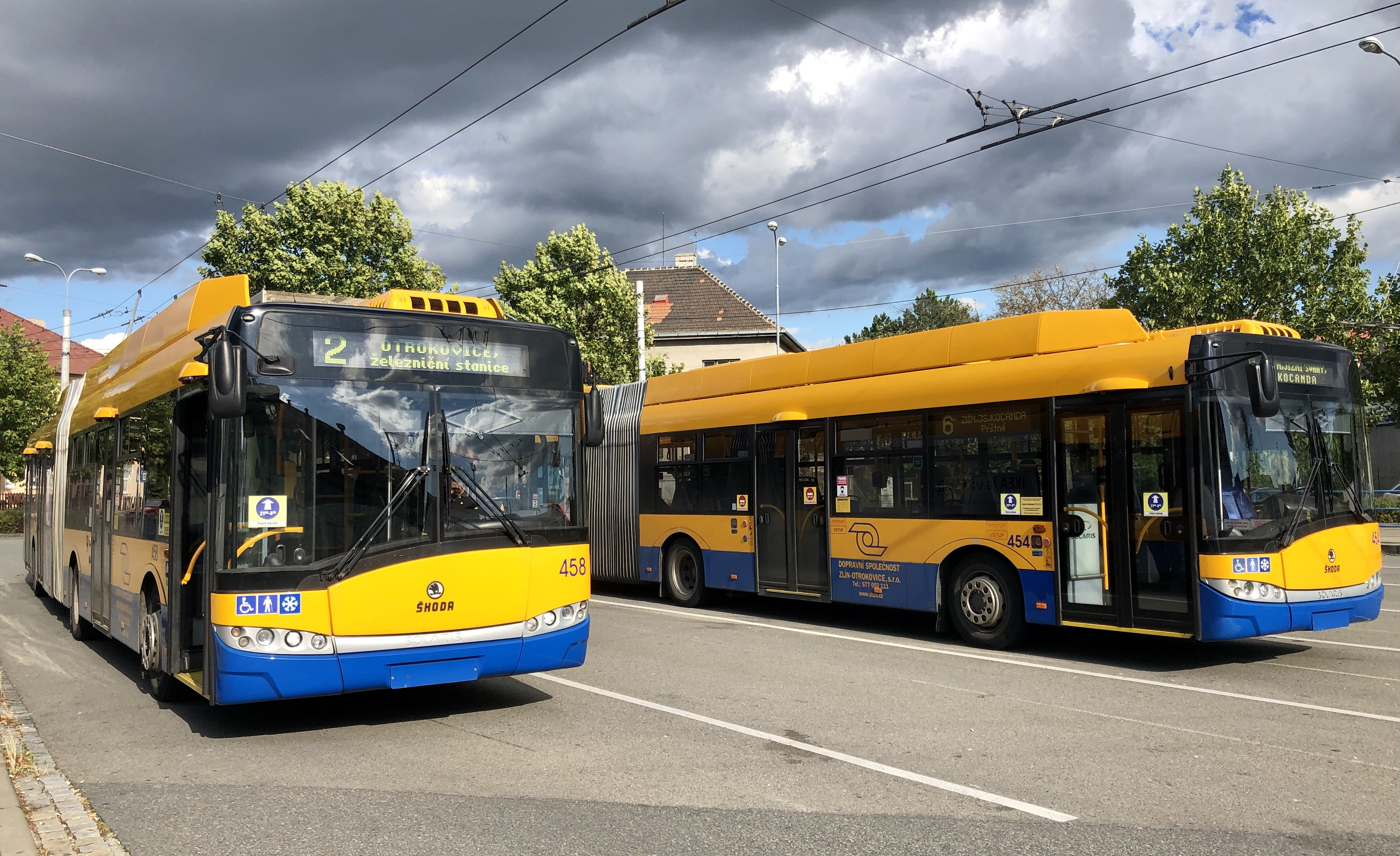
- Škoda 27T and Solaris trolleybuses in Otrokovice

Operation
- Locale: Zlín and Otrokovice, Czech Republic
- Open: 1944
- Status: Operational
- Operator: Dopravní společnost Zlín-Otrokovice

Infrastructure
- Electrification: 600 V DC
- Stock: 53 trolleybuses

Statistics
- Route length: 114 km (71 mi)
- Website: https://www.dszo.cz/ DSZO

Trolleybuses in Zlín and Otrokovice refers to a network of trolleybuses in the neighbouring Moravian towns of Zlín and Otrokovice, operated by the Zlín-Otrokovice Transport Company. Trolleybuses have been operating here since 1944, which makes Zlín the oldest trolleybus network in Moravia and the second oldest trolleybus transport network in the Czech Republic after Plzeň.

== History ==
With the increase in population and especially in the size of the city at the beginning of the Bata era, it was necessary to solve the problem of transporting people from different parts of the city, especially to the industrial plants. Since 1899, the local railway was the main burden, but it only passed through the centre of the city and was thus unable to serve the traffic of the new distant districts.

=== The beginnings of bus transport ===
As early as 1928, Pavel Vaculik's private bus service came into being, serving the eastern part of the city and connecting it with Bata's factories. However, the transport was limited to Bata's employees. Shortly afterwards, in 1930, permission was granted to a second private operator, František Pavelek, who introduced a line on an almost identical route to that operated by his competitor. The two companies were thus in competition with each other.

In 1940, a third bus operator, now controlled by Bata, joined the Otrokovice-Zlín-Vizovice Railway (OZVD). Its line already ran through the town and also reached westwards. It connected the Podhoří and Díly districts on different sides of the city together with Bata's factories. In 1943, it took over the other carriers and became the only transport provider in Zlín.
