= Barum (company) =

Czech rubber tyre company

Continental Barum

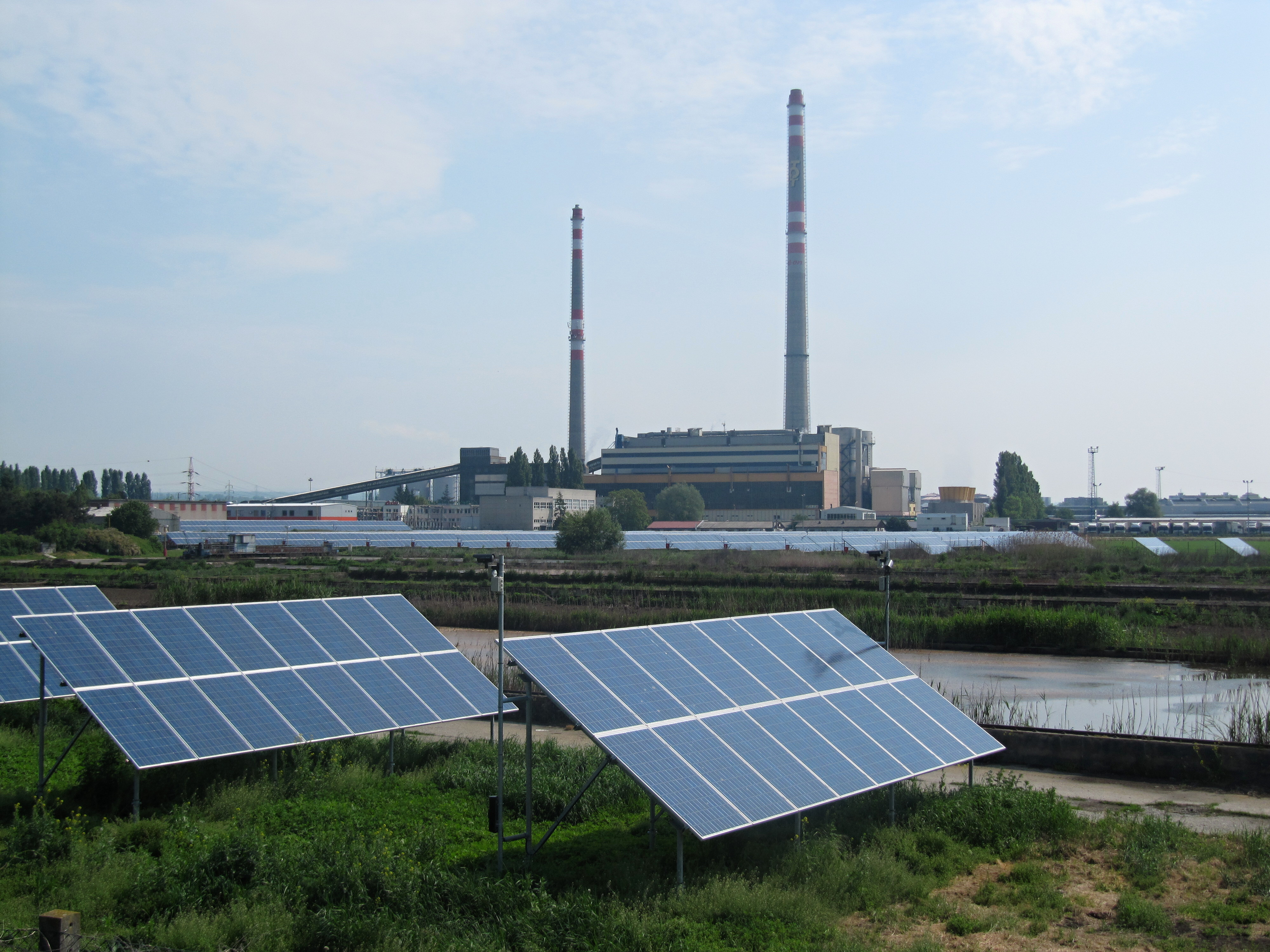
- Continental Barum factory in Otrokovice
- Type: Public
- Industry: Manufacturing
- Founded: 1948; 78 years ago in Czechoslovakia
- Headquarters: Otrokovice, Czech Republic
- Products: Tyres
- Revenue: 72,640,402,000 Czech koruna (2025)
- Operating income: 2,921,450,000 Czech koruna (2025)
- Net income: 2,157,774,000 Czech koruna (2025)
- Total assets: 34,568,927,000 Czech koruna (2025)
- Number of employees: 4,364 (2025)
- Parent: Continental AG
- Website: www.barum-tyres.com

Continental Barum s.r.o. is a Czech tyre manufacturer based in Otrokovice and part of the Continental group. The Otrokovice factory makes tyres for cars, trucks and industrial vehicles for several brands, including Barum and Continental. The Otrokovice plant is one of Continental's largest tyre production sites worldwide.

The business traces its origins to tyre production begun by Baťa in Zlín in 1932. The Barum trademark was registered in 1948, with its name derived from Baťa, Rubena and Matador. Production at the Otrokovice factory began in 1971, followed by its formal opening in 1972. The company was established as Barum Continental in 1993 following a joint-venture agreement with Continental.

== History ==
Baťa began making bicycle tyres in Zlín in 1931 and added car and truck tyres the following year. The company needed tyres for its delivery fleet and began making its own to cut the cost of imports.

After the 1945, Czechoslovak tyre manufacturers set up a common sales organisation under the Barum name, derived from Baťa, Rubena and Matador. The brand appeared in 1947, followed by registration of its winged-B logo in 1948. After nationalisation, Baťa's factories became Svit. Rubber production later became a separate state enterprise, Rudý říjen (Red October). It began making tubeless tyres in 1959, followed by radial tyres in 1967.

The new Otrokovice factory began production in 1971 and formally opened in 1972.

After the Velvet Revolution, Barum began looking for a foreign partner to help modernise its production. It reached an agreement with Continental in December 1992. The two companies launched their joint venture, Barum Continental, in March 1993. Continental invested in the factory and transferred production from other European plants. The name Continental Barum was adopted 2013.

== Production ==
The Otrokovice factory tyres sold under Continental, Barum, Uniroyal, General Tire, Matador and Semperit brands. In 2025, Continental reported that the plant had annual capacity for up to 19 million passenger-car tyres and more than one million truck and industrial tyres.

The company also makes moulds for tyre production within the Continental group. By 2018, it was using metal 3D printers to produce steel inserts for winter-tyre moulds.

A fully automated warehouse opened at the factory in January 2024. Conveyors carry tyres straight from production to the warehouse, where robots sort them and stack them on pallets. Previously, the company used several warehouses outside the factory.

== Sponsorship ==
Barum has sponsored the Barum Czech Rally Zlín since the first event in 1971. In 2025, Continental asked for its name to appear in the rally's title. The organisers retained the Barum name and added "powered by Continental".

Continental Barum also supports Zlín Film Festival and Holešovská Regata, a music festival held in the gardens of Holešov Castle.
