= Matador (company) =

Tire manufacturing company

Matador tire company
- Industry: Manufacturing
- Founded: September 1, 1905; 121 years ago Púchov, Slovakia
- Area served: Worldwide
- Products: Tires
- Owner: Continental AG
- Website: www.matador.tires/car

Matador is a Slovak brand of tyres for cars, vans and trucks, owned by the German manufacturer Continental AG.

The original Matador company was founded in Bratislava in 1905 as a rubber manufacturer and began producing tyres in 1925. Production at a factory in Púchov began in 1950 and tyres were manufactured under the Barum brand before adopting the Matador name in 1993.

Continental bought a majority stake in Matador’s rubber business in 2007 and the remaining shares in 2009.

== History ==
Matador was registered in September 1905, with production starting the following March at its factory in Petržalka. The first products were rubber hoses, belts and sealing sheets. Tyre production began in 1925, making Matador the first tyre manufacturer in Czechoslovakia. It remained the country's only tyre manufacturer until 1931.

In 1932, Matador merged with Pražské továrny na gumové zboží Vysočany, a rubber manufacturer in Prague. Most of the Vysočany factory's production was transferred to Slovakia the following year. After Nazi Germany annexed Petržalka in 1938, the Austrian manufacturer Semperit acquired a majority stake in Matador. The factory was ordered to supply the German military, producing goods including gas masks, aircraft fuel tanks and hoses.

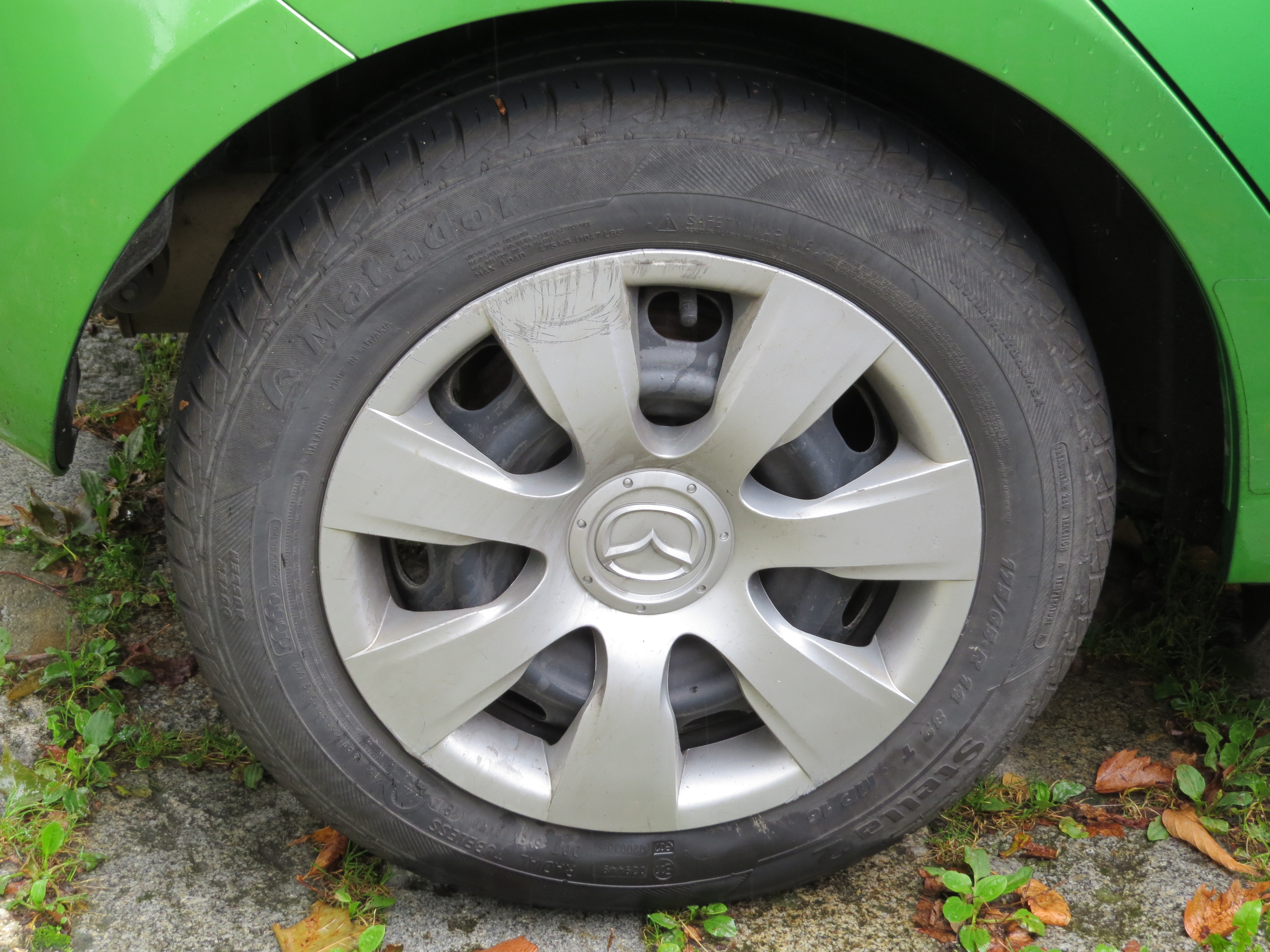
Automobile tire Matador Stella 2 175/65 R 14 (2017)

Matador was nationalised in 1945 and became a national enterprise in 1946. As part of the post-war industrialisation of Slovakia, construction of a new factory in Púchov began in 1947. Its foundation stone was laid on 7 September that year and tyre production began on 1 May 1950. The Púchov factory became an independent enterprise in 1953 under the name Gumárne 1. mája and manufactured tyres under the Barum brand.

The Púchov business adopted the Matador name on 1 July 1993. It was privatised in 1994, when managers and employees acquired a 70% stake. The management team was led by Štefan Rosina, who had joined the Púchov factory in 1950 and became its director in 1982.

Matador signed a joint-venture agreement with Omskshina in 1995. Their factory in Omsk, Russia, began producing passenger-car tyres in April 1996. A truck-tyre joint venture with Continental was established in 1998 and began production in Púchov in January 1999. In 2004, Matador also established a joint venture with Ethiopia's Addis Tyre Company.

Continental bought 51% of Matador’s rubber business in 2007. Its stake then rose to 66% in 2008 and 100% in 2009. The deal covered tyre production, conveyor belts and machinery for making tyres. Matador Holding retained the non-rubber businesses.

== Tire range ==
Matador sells tyres for passenger cars, SUVs, vans and trucks. Selected car and van product lines are listed below:

| Product line | Example models | Tyre type | Vehicles |
|---|---|---|---|
| Hectorra | Hectorra 5; Hectorra Van | Summer | Cars and vans |
| Nordicca | MP93 Nordicca; Nordicca Van | Winter | Cars and vans |
| All Weather | MP62 All Weather Evo | All-season | Cars |
| Maxilla | MPS300 Maxilla AP | Summer | Vans |
| Variant | MPS125 VariantAW | All-season | Vans |
| Izzarda | MP72 Izzarda A/T 2 | All-terrain | SUVs and light trucks |
