= Degenhart =

Degenhart is a surname. Notable people with the surname include:

- Elmar Degenhart (born 1959), German businessman
- Enrique Antonio Degenhart Asturias, Guatemalan government minister
- Ernesto José Degenhart (born 1966), Guatemalan swimmer

== See also ==
- Degenhardt
