= Juergen M. Geissinger =

German business executive

Jürgen M. Geissinger
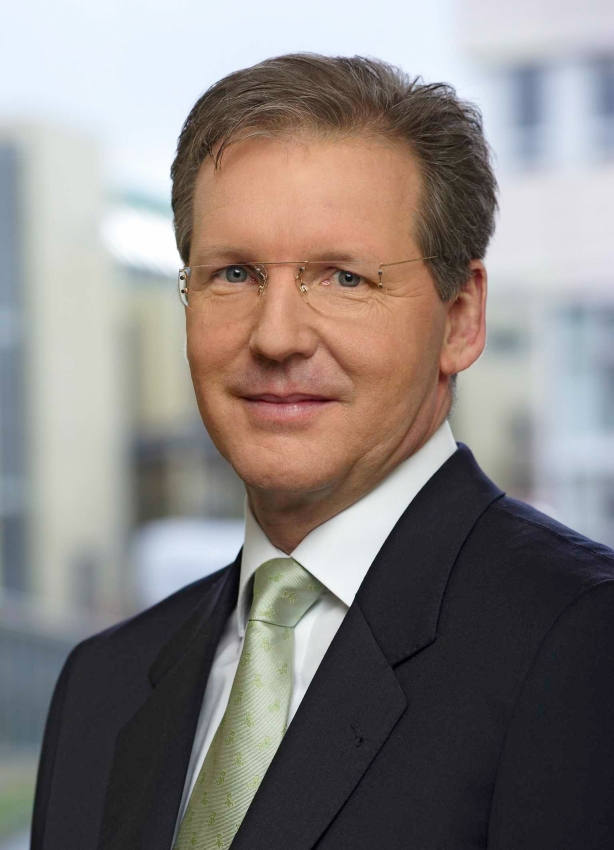
- Geissinger at Schaeffler's Headquarters in 2011
- Born: Jürgen Michael Geissinger; July 24, 1959 (age 67); Schwäbisch Gmünd, Germany.
- Education: University of Stuttgart (Dr.-Ing.)
- Occupations: President and CEO; Senvion S.A.
- Years active: 1991–present
- Board member of: Continental AG; MTU Aero Engines; Sandvik AB

Jürgen M. Geissinger (born July 24, 1959) is a German technology business executive and chief executive officer of Senvion S.A., a Hamburg-based wind turbine manufacturer. Geissinger is best known for his role as the Chief Executive of Schaeffler Technologies AG & Co. KG, a technology conglomerate known for its bearing solutions and precision components for engine and transmission systems for automotive, as well as industrial and aerospace applications. During Geissinger’s tenure as CEO, annual sales have risen more than fivefold. Schaeffler AG, employing over 76,000 people across 180 locations in 50 countries, with annual sales of $14 billion, is also the controlling shareholder of Continental AG with 49.9% of its shares.

Labor unions have labeled Geissinger a tough negotiator for saving costs. The German business magazine Capital portrayed him as a "comeback kid" after he overcame the challenge posed by the difficult takeover maneuver in 2008 of Continental AG that found itself in peril once Lehman Brothers collapsed and global financial markets were sent into turmoil. He holds a doctorate in engineering from the Fraunhofer Institute.

== Career ==
After a brief engagement at Heidelberger Druckmaschinen, Geissinger joined the ITT Corporation in Auburn Hills, Michigan, in 1992 serving in various positions at ITT Automotive. He quickly rose through the ranks after first overseeing the production technology for brake systems. By 1997, Geissinger was named CEO of ITT Industries Europe and responsible for worldwide brakes and chassis technology at ITT Automotive Industries in White Plains, New York.

=== Schaeffler AG ===
In 1998, Geissinger was tapped by Maria-Elisabeth Schaeffler, the matriarch of INA Holding Schaeffler KG, a privately held and German based supplier of bearing solutions and precision components for automotive and industrial applications. Following her brief conversation with the 38-year-old Geißinger during the Hannover Fair, the billionaire widow recalls she knew from their first encounter, Geissinger would be the one to follow in the footsteps and realize the dream of her late husband Georg Schaeffler, to build their business into a leading technology company in the world. At about that same time, Continental AG committed to purchase ITT's brake and chassis business for $1.93 billion. On 29 January 2012, the Financial Times Deutschland described Mrs. Schaeffler and Geissinger as a Dream-Team of the German economy.

==== LuK acquisition ====
In 2000 Geissinger oversaw his first merger with the acquisition of the remaining 50% of the clutch manufacturer LuK, the company founded by Georg Schaeffler and his brother Wilhelm Schaeffler.

==== FAG Kugelfischer AG acquisition ====
In 2001 Geissinger successfully launched a hostile bid and eventually took control of the publicly listed FAG Kugelfischer AG. FAG was subsequently delisted and integrated into Schaeffler KG. It was the first hostile takeover of a public listed MDAX company by a privately held company and was eventually cleared by the FTC following a review of anticompetitive effects. Under Geißinger’s watch, INA together with FAG became the second largest manufacturer of precision rolling bearings in the world.

==== Continental AG acquisition ====
Ten years after he left the company, Geissinger would return to Continental to acquire it for Schaeffler.

In 2008 Geissinger and Maria-Elisabeth Schaeffler set their sights on Continental AG, the prestigious automotive supplier with three times the revenue of Schaeffler. Also frequently referred to as 'Conti', Continental AG is a leading German auto and truck parts manufacturing company specializing in tires, brake systems, vehicle stability control systems, engine injection systems, tachographs, and other parts for the automotive and transportation industries. Continental had acquired ITT’s electronic brakes systems in 1998, the division Geißinger once oversaw. However, it was Continental’s acquisition of Siemens’ VDO automotive unit in 2007 for €11.4 billion that appeared to overextend Continental as it lost almost half of its market capitalization following that acquisition.

Geissinger and Maria-Elisabeth Schaeffler saw the opportunity before them and convinced a consortium of banks to join them in their effort to acquire a dominant stake in the publicly listed Continental. By August 2008, following months of fighting off Schaeffler’s advances, Continental agreed to be taken over by the family-owned auto parts manufacturer Schaeffler AG and a consortium of banks in a deal valuing the company at €12 billion. When Continental agreed to end the standoff and allow its smaller rival Schaeffler to buy up to half of the company, it paved the way for Geissinger to build the third-largest automotive supplier in the world (after Bosch and Denso Group). Schaeffler pledged to restrict its stake in the company to less than 50% for at least four years, so as to reduce concerns about immediate turnover of controlling interest to such a smaller buyer.

==== Global markets ====
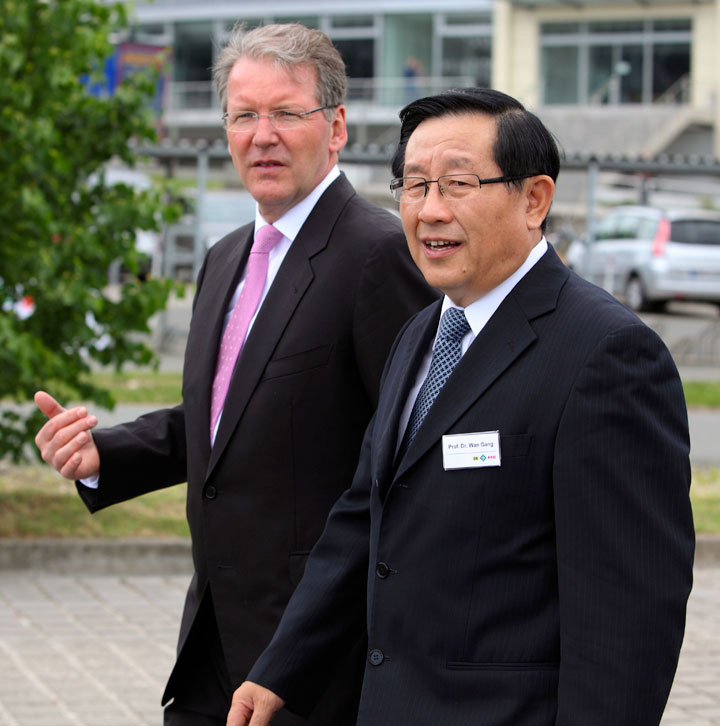
Geissinger with China's Minister of Science and Technology, Prof. Wan Gang (May 2011)

The Financial Times characterized Geissinger's strategy for Schaeffler as highly global, with almost three-quarters of its revenues coming from outside Germany. Geissinger said, "Asia is now close to 25 per cent of our turnover and it’s going in the direction of 30 per cent. We are increasingly developing the company to make it a series of hubs – making items in a specific region for that region. We now have more than 40 R&D centres around the world – with one of the biggest being in China."

While Schaeffler set up operations in China in 1995, Geissinger greatly expanded those and currently employs around 5,000 workers in seven manufacturing plants and offices. During a 2011 visit from China's Minister of Science and Technology Prof. Wan Gang, Geissinger said, "In view of the growing demand from the Chinese vehicle industry for innovative suppliers, Minister Wan Gang's visit is a signal for the future. Our systems expertise in electric mobility makes our company an active partner in the shaping of this sector."

On 10 June 2013, Geissinger presided over a groundbreaking ceremony in Ulyanovsk for Schaeffler's first production facility in Russia. The new plant went online in 2014 and produces automotive and industrial components.

Business positions
Preceded by Klaus G. Lederer	President of ITT Industries; 1997 - 1998	Succeeded by N/A
Preceded by Georg Schaeffler (until 1996)	President & CEO Schaeffler Technologies AG & Co. KG; 1998 - 2013	Succeeded by Klaus Rosenfeld
Preceded by Uwe Loos	CEO of FAG Kugelfischer Georg Schäfer AG; 2001 - 2004	Succeeded by N/A
