= Georg F. W. Schaeffler =

German businessman (born 1964)

- Born: 19 October 1964 (age 60); Erlangen, Germany
- Education: University of St. Gallen; Duke University
- Occupation: Businessman
- Title: Chairman of Schaeffler Group
- Spouse: Divorced
- Children: 4
- Parent(s): Georg and Maria-Elisabeth Schaeffler

Georg Friedrich Wilhelm Schaeffler (born 19 October 1964) is a German billionaire businessman and owner of 80% of the holding company INA Holding Schaeffler GmbH & Co. KG, which includes the manufacturer of rolling element bearings Schaeffler AG. His mother, Maria-Elisabeth Schaeffler, owns the other 20%. Both inherited their fortune from Schaeffler's father, Georg Schaeffler, who died in 1996. Schaeffler is the head of the supervisory board of Schaeffler Group and a member of the supervisory board of Continental AG. As of May 2023, Schaeffler was ranked by Forbes as the 171st richest person in the world, with a net worth of $10.2 billion.

== Early life ==
Georg Friedrich Wilhelm Schaeffler was born 1964 in Erlangen to Georg Schaeffler and Maria-Elisabeth Schaeffler. His father Georg and his uncle Wilhelm Schaeffler had founded the Wilhelm Schaeffler AG, which flourished during the Third Reich. It used slave labor and produced both textiles and armaments and became the Schaeffler Group.

Schaeffler served two years in the German armed forces, reaching the rank of lieutenant in the air force reserves. From 1986 to 1990, Schaeffler studied business and economics at the University of St. Gallen, Switzerland. He worked within the Schaeffler Group from 1990 to 1996.

He later went on to receive a law degree and a masters from Duke University and practised international business law in Dallas, Texas.

== Career ==
Schaeffler expanded his parents company over the years. In 1999, he took over the German automotive manufacturer LuK GmbH, and in 2002, the German producer of ball bearings FAG Kugelfischer. After the expense of $15 billion, in 2008 Georg and the newly founded Schaeffler Group, acquired auto parts giant and one of the largest tire manufacturers in the world, Continental AG.

In 2012, the US Internal Revenue Service (IRS) "...embarked on a contentious audit of Schaeffler, eventually determining that he owed about $1.2 billion in unpaid taxes and penalties. According to ProPublica after seven years of grinding bureaucratic combat, the IRS abandoned its campaign", and accepted "tens of millions".

As of 2015, the Schaeffler Group employed over 80,000 people in 170 locations in 49 countries.

He is a member of the Central Advisory Board of the Commerzbank

== Personal life ==
As of 2015, Schaeffler was divorced with four children and lived in Herzogenaurach. He visits the United States several times a year.

According to Forbes in 2018, Schaeffler has a net worth of US$20.1 billion. In March 2020, Schaeffler was ranked #96 on Forbes' list of global billionaires and #4 for Germany. He and his mother's (Maria-Elisabeth Schaeffler) combined wealth is estimated to be US$34 billion. As of May 2023, Schaeffler was ranked by Forbes as the 171st richest person in the world, with a net worth of $10.2 billion.
