= VDO (company) =

German company

VDO logo

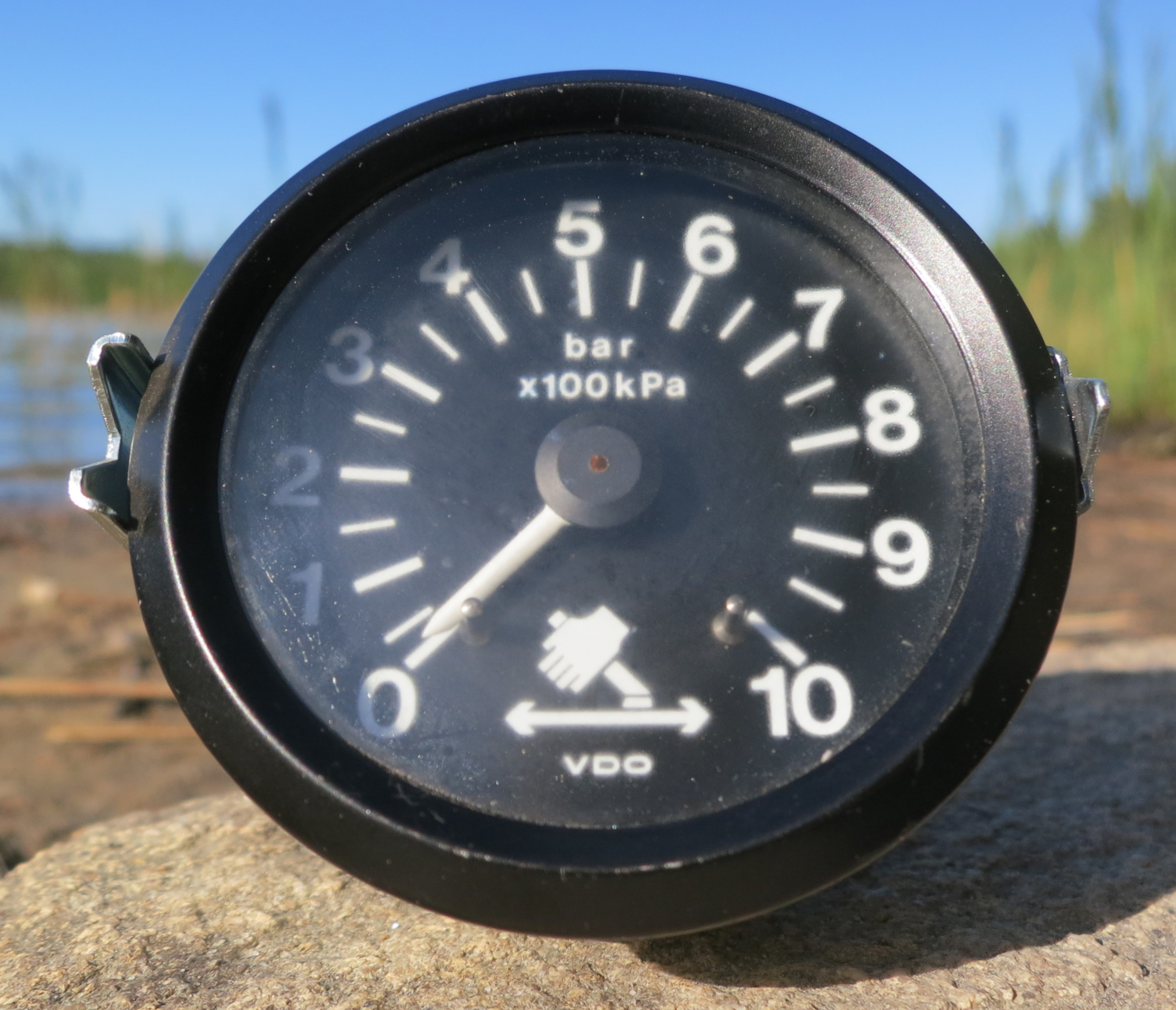
Engine oil pressure gauge by VDO

VDO is a German brand of Aumovio which makes automotive electronics and mechatronics for powertrains, engine management systems and fuel injection systems. A full range of Tachograph, Data Management, and Telematics products are produced. VDO has also supplied components for pleasure boats, yachts and sailing boats since 1958. In 2018 the marine business was separated into VDO Marine, offering products made by Swiss manufacture Veratron AG.

== History ==
VDO was founded by Adolf Schindling and the result of a merger between DEUTA (Deutsche Tachometer-Werke GmbH, English: German Speedometer Works, Ltd.) and OTA Apparate GmbH (Offenbacher Tachometer-Werke GmbH, English: (City of) Offenbach Speedometer Works, Ltd.) in Frankfurt am Main in 1929. VDO stands for "Vereinigte DEUTA - OTA, English: United DEUTA - OTA."

In 1991, the company was acquired by Mannesmann. In 1999, Mannesmann was acquired by Vodafone and VDO was offered for sale. In 2000, the company was acquired by Siemens and re-branded as Siemens VDO. Siemens sold VDO to Continental in 2007. With the spin-off of the Continental Automotive division in 2025, VDO became part of the newly founded company Aumovio.
