= Degenhardt =

Degenhardt is a German surname. Notable people with the surname include:

- Connor Degenhardt (born 1998), American football player and college football coach
- Franz Josef Degenhardt (1931–2011), German poet, writer, musician and politician
- Gertrude Degenhardt (1940–2025), German lithographer and illustrator, sister-in-law of Franz Josef
- Hugo Degenhardt, English drummer
- Jan Degenhardt (born 1962), German lawyer and folk-singer, son of Franz Josef
- Jessica Degenhardt (born 2002), German luger
- Johannes Joachim Degenhardt (1926–2002), German Roman Catholic archbishop and cardinal
- Jürgen Degenhardt (1930–2014), German songwriter, actor, director and author
- Lena Degenhardt (born 1999), German handball player
- Louisa Degenhardt, Australian drug and alcohol researcher, and scientia professor

Fictional characters:

- Adrian Degenhardt, a character in the German television soap opera Verbotene Liebe

== See also ==
- Mount Degenhardt, a mountain in Whatcom County, Washington, United States
- The Degenhardts, a 1944 German drama film
- Degenhart, a surname
