= Semperit =

Austrian manufacturer of industrial polymer products

Semperit AG Holding
- Type: Aktiengesellschaft
- Traded as: WBAG: SEM
- Industry: Manufacturing
- Founded: 1824; 202 years ago
- Headquarters: Vienna, Austria
- Key people: Manfred Stanek (CEO), Helmut Sorger (CFO), Gerfried Eder (CIO), Cord Prinzhorn (Chairman of the supervisory board)
- Products: hoses, rubber sheeting, conveyor belts, moulded rubber products
- Revenue: €721.1 million (2023)
- Total assets: €937.9 million (2023)
- Total equity: €425.3 million (2023)
- Number of employees: 4,600 (2023)
- Website: www.semperitgroup.com

Semperit AG Holding is a manufacturer of industrial polymer and plastic products based in Vienna, Austria. From the middle 20th century, it produced bicycle tires for the Austrian road bicycle sold by Sears & Roebuck, including the classic white wall tires. Semperit is listed on the Vienna Stock Exchange, 50% of the company is owned by B&C Holding, with the rest being free float.

== History ==
1824 Johann Nepomuk Reithoffer receives the patent for waterproof fabrics

1852 Construction of first European factory for rubber products in Wimpassing, Austria

1890 Semperit goes public

1920 Start of latex glove production

1938-1945 After the Anschluss of Austria in 1938, Semperit remained formally independent, although the company entered into a cooperation agreement with Continental AG. During the years that followed, Semperit became part of the German wartime economy. The company produced rubber products for military use, including protective suits and inflatable boats. Because many workers were drafted into the military, Semperit also used forced labour during the war.

Franz Josef Messner became General Director of Semperit in 1937. Although he managed a company of importance for the wartime economy, he was also involved in the Austrian resistance. He was a member of the Maier-Messner-Caldonazzi resistance group, which passed military and industrial information to the Allies. In March 1944, Messner was arrested by the Gestapo. After several months in prison, he was executed in Mauthausen concentration camp on 23 April 1945.

In the aftermath of the Second World War, large quantities of the company's machinery were dismantled as war reparations. Even though this rendered manufacturing more difficult, Semperit restarted production in August 1945 and slowly rebuilt the company in the years that followed.

1949 Semperit begins manufacturing System Hans Hass swim fins designed by Hans Hass

1985 Sale of tyre production unit, focus on industrial and medical sectors

1996 Launch of company's sites in Thailand and China

1998 Acquisition of plant in Odry, Czech Republic

2000 Acquisition of plant in Belchatów, Poland

2001 Acquisition of majority stake in Indian conveyor belt plant

2007 Start-up of new hose factory in China

2012 Acquisition of Latexx Partners, Kamunting, Malaysia

2015 Acquisition of Leeser, Germany

2020 Strategic policy decision to focus on industrial sector

2022 Sale of medical business Sempermed

2023 Acquisition of RICO Group, a leading liquid silicone-processing group (Upper Austria)
