= Aumovio =

German automotive-technology company

AUMOVIO SE
- Type: Public
- Traded as: FWB: AMV0
- Industry: Automotive technology, vehicle electronics, software-defined vehicles
- Predecessor: Division of Continental AG
- Founded: 2025
- Headquarters: Frankfurt, Germany
- Area served: Worldwide
- Key people: Philipp von Hirschheydt (CEO)
- Revenue: ~€18.5 billion
- Owners: IHO Group 46%; BlackRock ~2.5%; Vanguard Group 2.1%
- Number of employees: ~82,000
- Website: www.aumovio.com

AUMOVIO SE is a German automotive-technology company specialising in vehicle electronics, software-defined systems and mobility solutions for safe, exciting, connected and autonomous driving. It was formed in 2025 as a spin-off of Continental AG’s Automotive business.

AUMOVIO develops hardware, software and integrated systems for passenger and commercial vehicles, including sensor solutions, display and cockpit electronics, braking and motion systems, software architectures and assistance systems for software-defined vehicles.

== History ==
In August 2024 the Executive Board of Continental AG decided to conduct a review of a spin-off of the Automotive division with a planned stock market listing. In December 2024, the Continental Executive Board then decided to spin off the Automotive division. All preparations were to be completed by the end of the third quarter of 2025, so that a holding structure would be in place by the end of 2025. On March 12, 2025, the Supervisory Board approved the plan and also recommended that the 2025 Shareholders’ Meeting approve it.

On March 19, 2025, the decision was made to locate the headquarters of the planned spin-off in Frankfurt. The official announcement of the new name, AUMOVIO, was then made on April 23, 2025, at Auto Shanghai. Two days later, the shareholders at the Annual General Meeting of Continental AG approved the spin-off. On June 5, 2025, the Supervisory Board appointed the new members of the Executive Board. On 24 June 2025, at its first Capital Market Day, AUMOVIO disclosed long-term strategic targets including revenue exceeding €24 billion and an adjusted EBIT margin of 6 %–8 %. The company made its public debut under the AUMOVIO brand at IAA Mobility 2025 and then completed its listing on the Frankfurt Stock Exchange on September 18, 2025 under ticker AMV0. The legal form chosen was that of the European stock corporation “Societas Europaea (SE)”.

== Products ==
AUMOVIO's primary business activities involve the design and production of electronics and components for vehicles of all kinds, including software-defined and autonomous vehicles. These include sensor systems, displays, brake and comfort systems for original equipment, as well as aftermarket products such as brake pads, batteries, and sensors. The company is also active in the development of software, architecture platforms, and assistance systems, including technologies for automated driving in commercial vehicles. In the aftermarket business, AUMOVIO distributes replacement parts and repair components, including brake pads, sensors, and electronic and mechatronic components, among others under the ATE and VDO brands. In addition, commercial vehicle solutions such as tachographs and fleet management systems are marketed under the VDO brand.

== Financials ==
The Schaeffler family is the major shareholder of AUMOVIO, holding slightly less than half of the shares, as it does in Continental AG. In the course of the spin-off, Continental shareholders received shares in proportion to their Continental holdings. The allocation ratio was 2:1. This means that for every two Continental shares, one share in the automotive company AUMOVIO was issued. Shareholders were free to decide whether to keep or sell their shares.

== Corporate structure ==
With around 82,000 employees, the business areas of AUMOVIO SE generated sales of about 18.5 billion euros in the 2025 fiscal year. The company is headquartered in Frankfurt am Main. AUMOVIO has 80 locations in 24 countries. Philipp von Hirschheydt has been CEO since 2025, and Stefan E. Buchner is Chairman of the Supervisory Board.

- Philipp von Hirschheydt — Chief Executive Officer
- Claus Bauer — Chief Financial Officer and IT
- Ingo Holstein — Chief Human Resources Officer
- Jean-François Tarabbia — Chief Technology Officer, Architecture and Network Solutions
- Boris Mergell — Safety and Motion
- Ismail Dagli — Autonomous and Commercial Mobility
