= Elmar Degenhart =

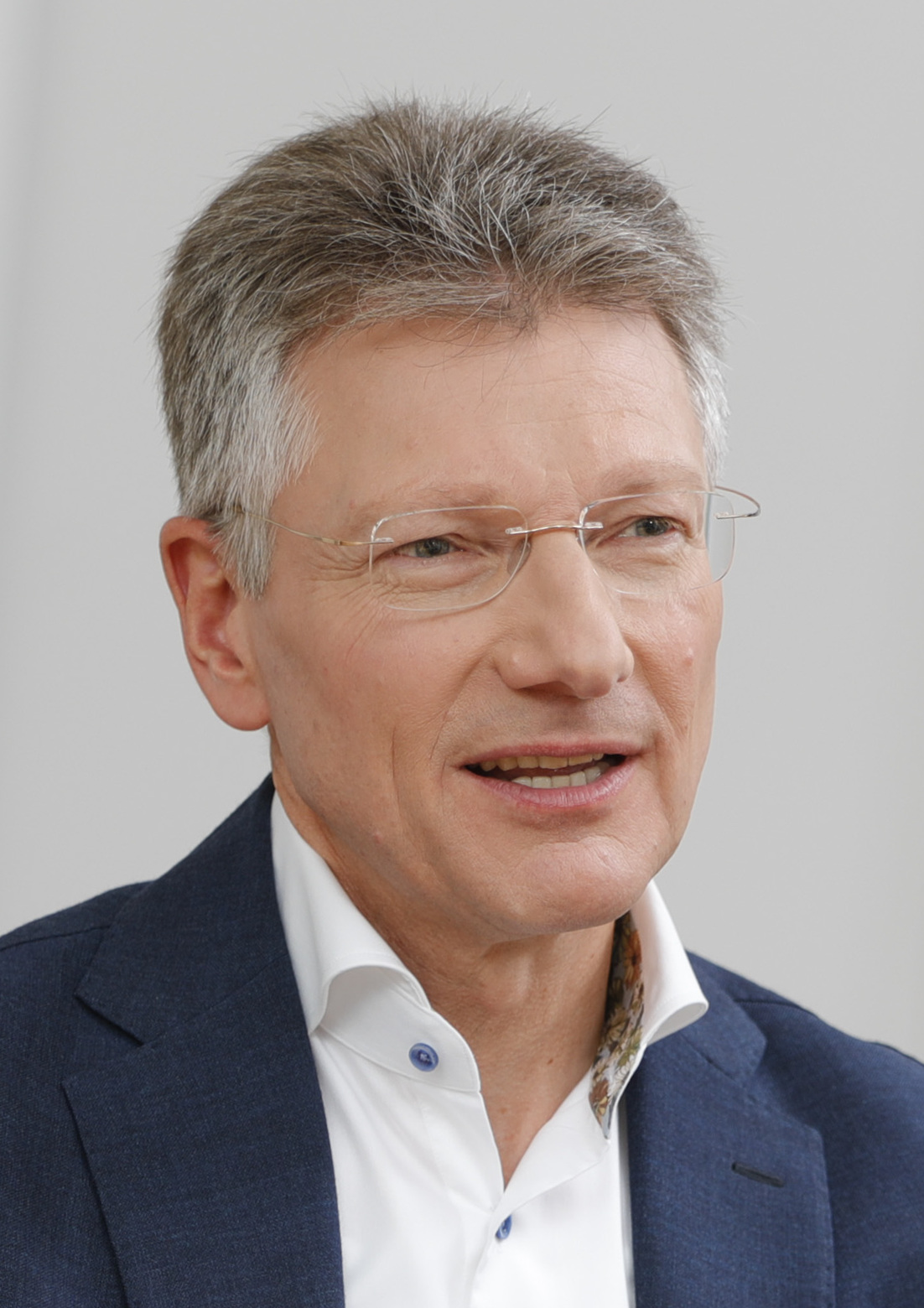
- Elmar Degenhart, 2017
- Born: January 29, 1959 (age 67); Dossenheim, Germany
- Education: University of Stuttgart; Fraunhofer Institute
- Occupations: CEO, Continental
- Predecessor: Karl-Thomas Neumann

Elmar Walter Degenhart (born January 29, 1959) is a German manager and was chairman of the Board of Continental AG from August 2009 to November 2020.

== Education ==
Degenhart studied Aerospace Engineering at the University of Stuttgart and then received his doctorate from the Fraunhofer Institute for Manufacturing Engineering and Automation (IPA) in the field of clean room technology.

== Career ==
He began his career in 1993 at ITT Automotive Europe, where he held various executive positions. In 1998, he became a member of the executive board of Continental Teves AG & Co OHG, in Frankfurt / Main. In 2004, he became chairman of the Chassis Systems Division at Robert Bosch GmbH, in Stuttgart. Between 2005 and 2008 he was chief executive officer (CEO) of the Keiper Recaro Group, in Kaiserslautern. He was also chairman of the board of the parent company, Putsch GmbH & Co. KG, in Kaiserslautern. In August 2008, Degenhart became Automotive director of Schaeffler KG, in Herzogenaurach.

On 12 August 2009, he succeeded Continental CEO Karl-Thomas Neumann, and became the new CEO of Continental AG, in Hannover. In December 2013, his contract was extended until 2019.

On 29 October 2020, Degenhart unexpectedly announces that he will resign from his office as chairman of the executive board of Continental AG on 30 November 2020 for health reasons. Later, he explained that he had suffered a hearing loss, whereupon the doctors prescribed him rest.

== Awards ==
In 2015, Degenhart was awarded the Karmarsch Medal by Leibniz Universitätsgesellschaft Hannover e.V. for his performance in the reorientation and further development of the Continental AG.

== Affiliations ==
Since 1979, Degenhart is a member of the Catholic fraternity A.V. Alania Stuttgart.
