= Riet Cadonau =

- Born: 12 May 1961 (age 64); Basel, Switzerland
- Education: Licenciate (Lic.oec.publ.), University of Zurich
- Occupation: Chairman of dormakaba Group until 2023

Riet Cadonau (born 12 May 1961, Basel, Switzerland) was Chairman of Dormakaba, a global security group based in Switzerland.

== Life ==
Cadonau studied at the University of Zurich and graduated with a Master of Arts in Economics and Business Administration. Furthermore, he completed the Advanced Management Program at INSEAD in France.

From 1990 to 2001, he worked for IBM Switzerland in various management positions. From 2001 to 2005, he was a member of the Executive Board of Ascom. Afterwards, he worked as Managing Director for ACS, Inc. (today Xerox). From 2007 to 2011, he was CEO of Ascom.

From 2011, he served as CEO of Kaba Group, a company in the security industry, and from 2015 to 2021, he was CEO of dormakaba Group, the succeeding organization of Kaba Group. Cadoneau was Chairman of the Board of Directors of dormakaba Group from October 2018 to May 2023.

Moreover, he was President of the Swiss Management Association from 2004 to 2009 and member of the Board of Directors of Kaba Group and Griesser Group between 2006 and 2011. Since 2013, he has been member of the Board of Directors of Zehnder Group, since 2016 member of the Board of Directors of Georg Fischer AG and since 2021 member of the Board of Directors of Logitech International.

In the Swiss Air Force, he held the rank of lieutenant colonel general staff.
