= Otrokovice =

- Town
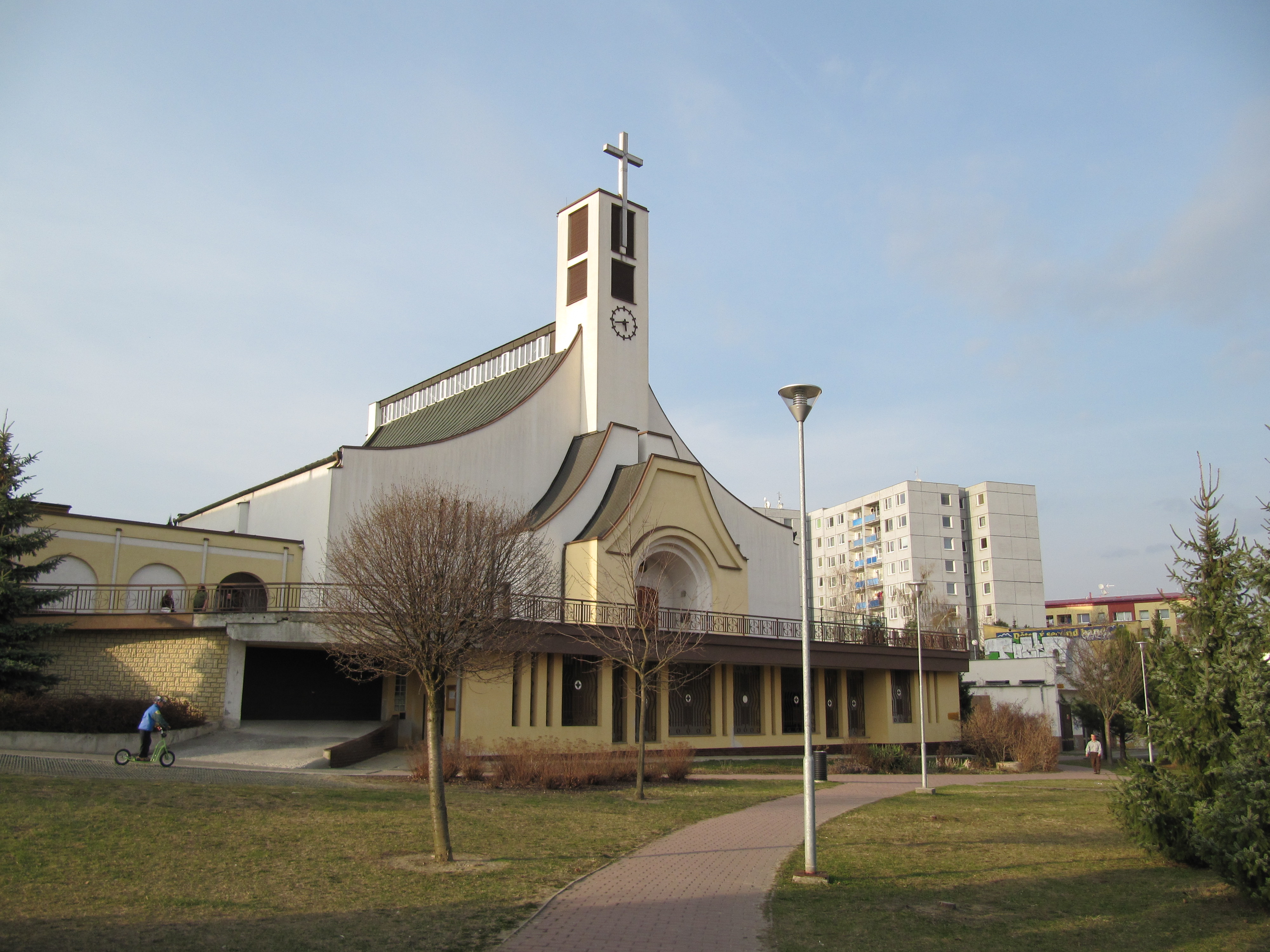
- Church of Saint Adalbert

- Flag Coat of arms

- Location in the Czech Republic
- Coordinates: 49°12′36″N 17°31′51″E
- Country: Czech Republic
- Region: Zlín
- District: Zlín
- First mentioned: 1141

Government
  - Mayor: Hana Večerková (ANO)

Area
  - Total: 19.63 km^{2} (7.58 sq mi)
- Elevation: 190 m (620 ft)

Population (2026-01-01)
  - Total: 17,239
  - Density: 878.2/km^{2} (2,275/sq mi)
- Time zone: UTC+1 (CET)
  - Summer (DST): UTC+2 (CEST)
- Postal code: 765 02
- Website: www.otrokovice.cz

Otrokovice (Czech pronunciation: [ˈotrokovɪtsɛ]; German: Otrokowitz) is a town in Zlín District in the Zlín Region of the Czech Republic. It has about 17,000 inhabitants. The town is located at the confluence of the Morava and Dřevnice rivers and is known as an industrial centre, with a tradition in the production of shoes and tyres.

== Administrative division ==
Otrokovice consists of two municipal parts (in brackets population according to the 2021 census):

- Otrokovice (12,391)
- Kvítkovice (4,740)

== Etymology ==
The town's name is derived from the word otrok, meaning 'child' or 'juvenile' in old Czech (instead of 'slave' in modern Czech). There are several theories as how the name originated. Otrokovice may have been owned by an immature owner in the distant past, or the settlement could be established as property for some of the children of the owner of the surrounding lands.

== Geography ==
Otrokovice is located about 8 kilometres (5 mi) west of Zlín. The eastern part of the municipal territory lies in the Vizovice Highlands and the western part lies in the southern tip of the Upper Morava Valley. The highest point is at 325 m (1,066 ft) above sea level. The town lies at the confluence of the Morava and Dřevnice rivers, and the Mojena Stream. The Morava forms the western border of the municipal territory.

== History ==
The first written mention of Otrokovice is in a deed of bishop Jindřich Zdík from 1141. Until 1570, it was a part of the Malenovice estate. Between 1570 and 1649, it was a separate estate and a fortress, which served as the manor house, was built. From 1649, Otrokovice estate was merged with Napajedla estate and remained its part until the abolishment of manorialism in 1848. The manor house was demolished before 1767.

A railway through Otrokovice was buil in 1841. A railway station was not established until 1882. Important for the development of Otrokovice was the construction of a new railway Otrokovice–Zlín–Vizovice in 1899.

The fastest development of Otrokovice occurred in the 1930s, after Tomáš Baťa bought land here and had built auxiliary plants and aircraft production of his Bata company. A modern industrial district called Baťov was built, and the municipality was renamed Baťov for several years. In 1960, the municipalities of Otrokovice and Kvítkovice were merged. Otrokovice became a town in 1964. In the following decades, further industrial expansion occurred.

== Demographics ==
Historical population

Year	Pop.	±%
1869	1,351	—
1880	1,489	+10.2%
1890	1,545	+3.8%
1900	1,629	+5.4%
1910	1,752	+7.6%

Year	Pop.	±%
1921	1,927	+10.0%
1930	2,645	+37.3%
1950	8,929	+237.6%
1961	10,486	+17.4%
1970	11,925	+13.7%

Year	Pop.	±%
1980	18,082	+51.6%
1991	20,267	+12.1%
2001	19,261	−5.0%
2011	18,343	−4.8%
2021	17,131	−6.6%

Source: Censuses

== Economy ==
In past the town was significantly connected with the Bata company which owned multiple local industries including the large shoe factory that created its initial wealth.

Continental Barum has a manufacturing facility in Otrokovice and is the largest employer with headquarters in the Zlín Region. This tyre producer was founded in 1948 by merger of three tyre manufacturers. The company became part of the German Continental AG conglomerate in 1993.

Another important manufacturing sites are the large TOMA Industrial Zone where various companies of various industries are located, and Zlin Aircraft that operates from the airfield next to the Barum factory.

== Transport ==
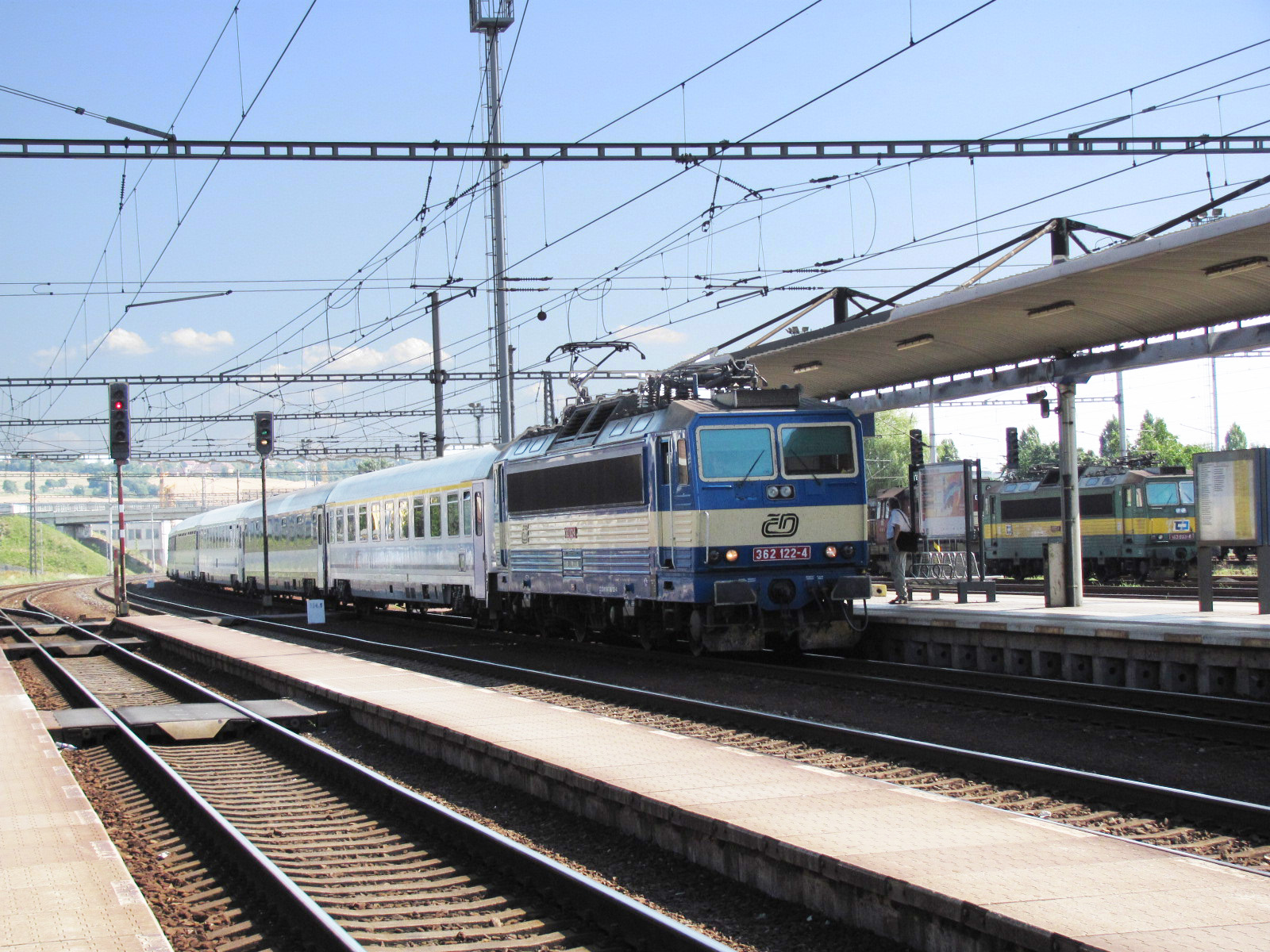
Otrokovice railway station

The D55 motorway runs through the town. The I/49 road splits from it and connects Otrokovice with Zlín.

Otrokovice is a major railway junction of the Zlín Region. Otrokovice railway station lies on the railway of national importance and has connection to main Czech cities. It is located on the lines Prague–Luhačovice and Brno–Olomouc (further continuing to Poland, Slovakia and Hungary).

Otrokovice has a regular bus service, linking main areas of the town. The town operates a transport company together with the neighbouring city of Zlín. Trolleybus line connects Otrokovice with Zlín.

In addition to the conventional modes of transport, Otrokovice is also equipped with a private domestic airport and a wharf at the Morava River.

== Sights ==
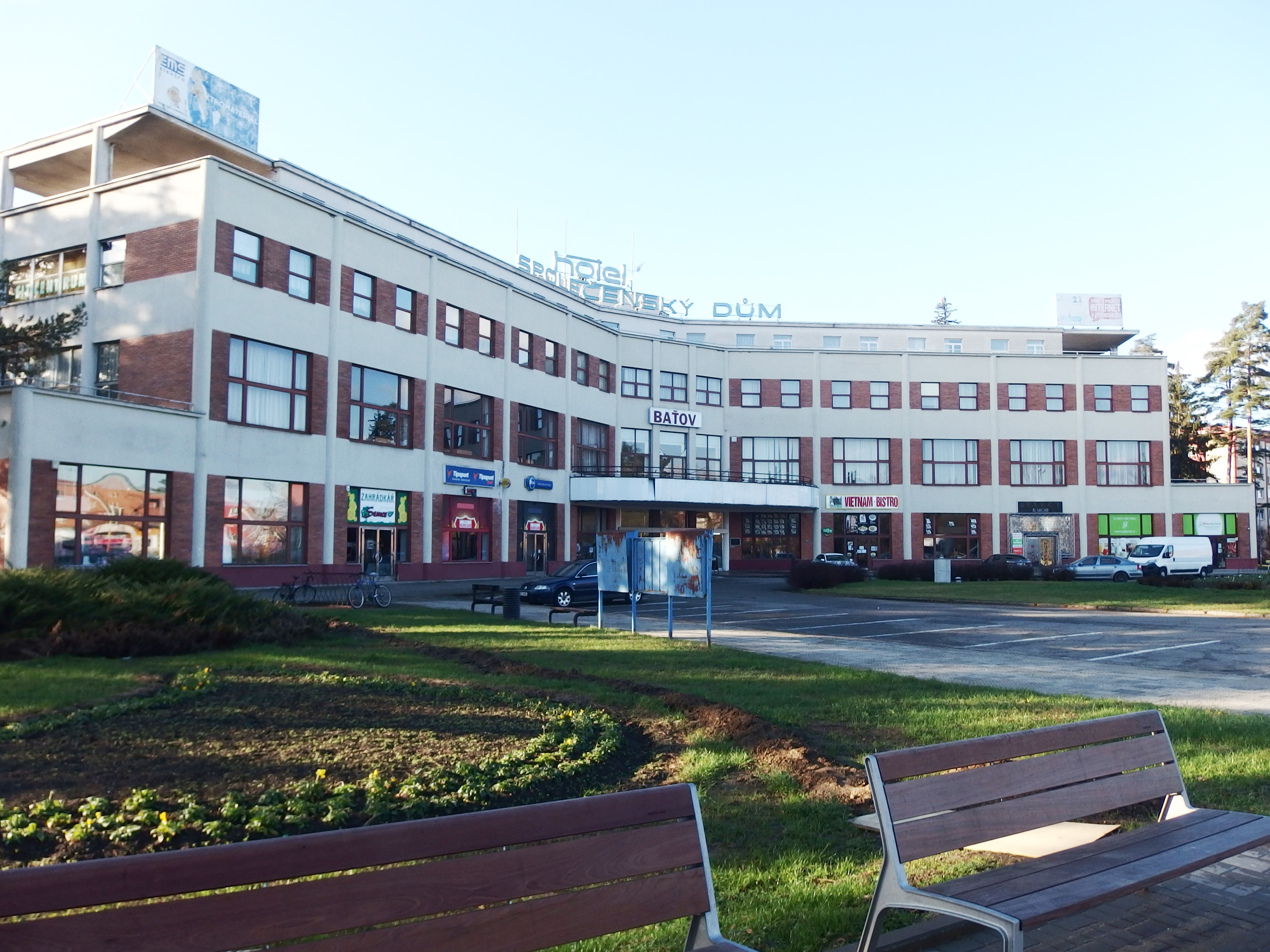
Společenský dům

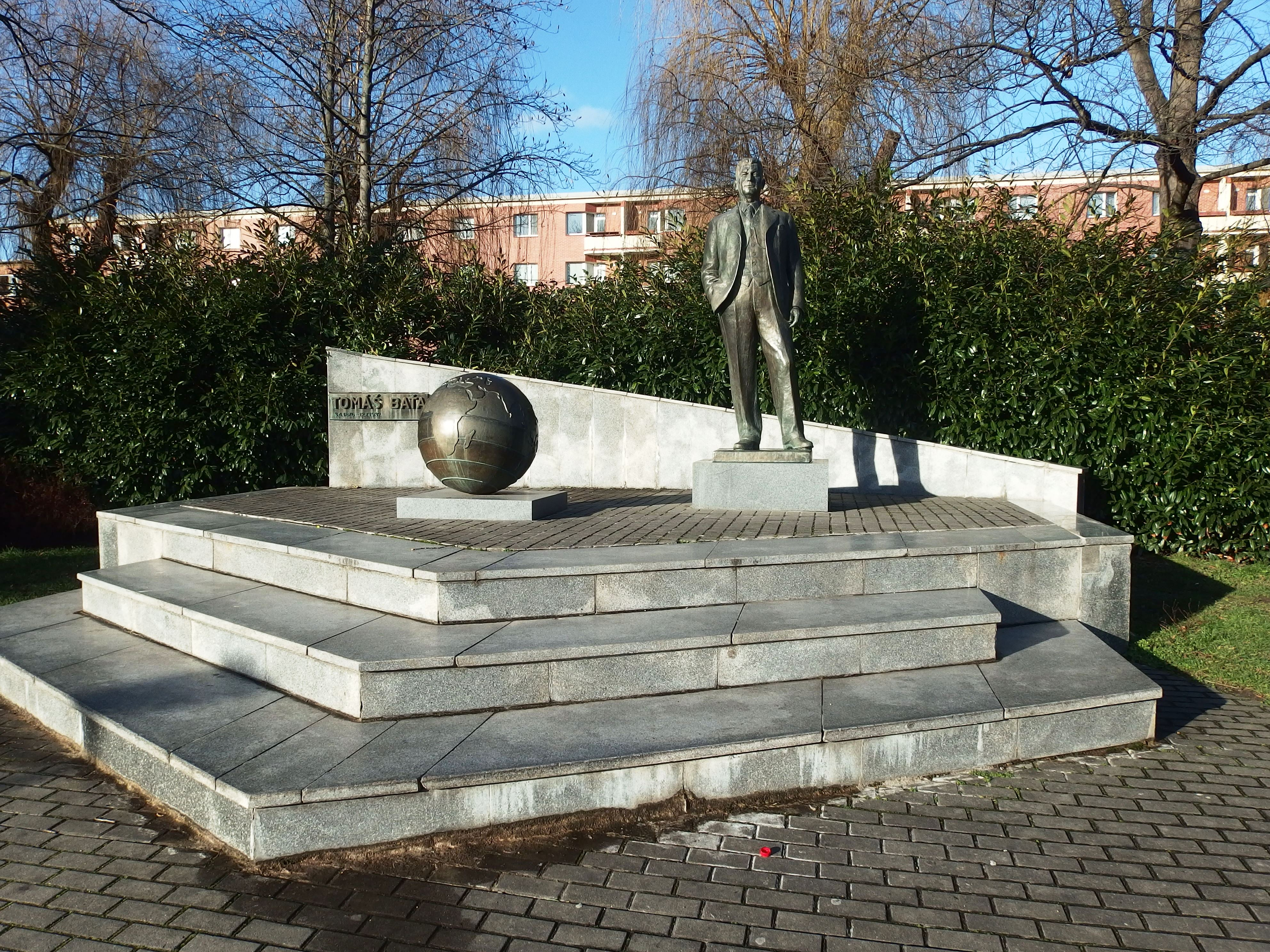
Tomáš Baťa statue

Společenský dům (i.e. "Social House") is architecturally the most valuable building from the Baťa's era. It was designed by Vladimír Karfík and built in 1936. This functionalist building serves today as a hotel and is protected as a cultural monument.

The Church of Saint Michael the Archangel is located on the town square in the original centre of Otrokovice. It was built as a chapel in 1769 and expanded into a church a hundred years later.

The Church of Saint Adalbert was built in 1995 and is modern landmark of the town.

The statue of St. John of Nepomuk on the town square was created in 1823. The statue of St. John of Nepomuk in Kvítkovice comes from 1723. According to legend, the statue in Kvítkovice was originally in Otrokovice and was bought for beer.

The statue of Tomáš Baťa is cast from the original located in the English Tilbury. There is also a memorial to the site of the plane crash in Otrokovice, when Tomáš Baťa died in 1932.

== Notable people ==
- Josef Odložil (1938–1993), athlete, Olympic medalist
- Pavel Svojanovský (1943–2024), rower, Olympic medalist
- Oldřich Svojanovský (1946–2026), rower, Olympic medalist
- Pavel Valoušek (born 1979), rally driver
- Jan Kameník (born 1982), football manager
- Pavla Gajdošíková (born 1991), actress
- Jakub Jugas (born 1992), footballer

== Twin towns – sister cities ==
Otrokovice is twinned with:

- Dubnica nad Váhom, Slovakia
- Partizánske, Slovakia
- Vác, Hungary
- Zawadzkie, Poland
