= Continental AG =

German multinational automotive component supplier

- Type: Public
- Traded as: FWB: CON; DAX component
- ISIN: DE0005439004
- Industry: Tire manufacturing; Industrial products
- Founded: 8 October 1871; 155 years ago
- Founders: Hanover-based industrialists and bankers
- Headquarters: Hanover, Germany
- Area served: Worldwide
- Key people: Sabrina Soussan (supervisory board chair); Christian Kötz (CEO)
- Products: Tires; Rubber products; Thermoplastic products
- Brands: General Tire; Matador
- Revenue: ▼€19,676 million (2025)
- Operating income: ▼€272 million (2025)
- Net income: ▼ −€135 million (2025)
- Total assets: ▼€17,792 million (2025)
- Total equity: ▼€4,158 million (2025)
- Owner: IHO Group (46%)
- Number of employees: ▼92,653 (2025)
- Divisions: ContiTech; Tires
- Subsidiaries: Continental Barum; Hoosier Racing Tire
- Website: www.continental.com

Continental AG, commonly known as Continental and informally as Conti, is a German multinational manufacturer of tires and industrial rubber and thermoplastic products. Founded in 1871, it is headquartered in Hanover, Lower Saxony. It ranked fourth worldwide by tire sales in 2025.

Continental makes tires for cars, commercial vehicles, motorcycles, bicycles and industrial vehicles. It sells tires under the Continental, Barum, General Tire, Matador and Semperit brands, and under Uniroyal. Its ContiTech division produces hoses, conveyor belts, drive belts, air springs and other industrial products.

Continental's powertrain division was spun off as Vitesco Technologies in 2021 and its automotive division as Aumovio in 2025. In July 2026, the company agreed to sell ContiTech to an affiliate of Lone Star Funds, subject to regulatory approval.

== History ==
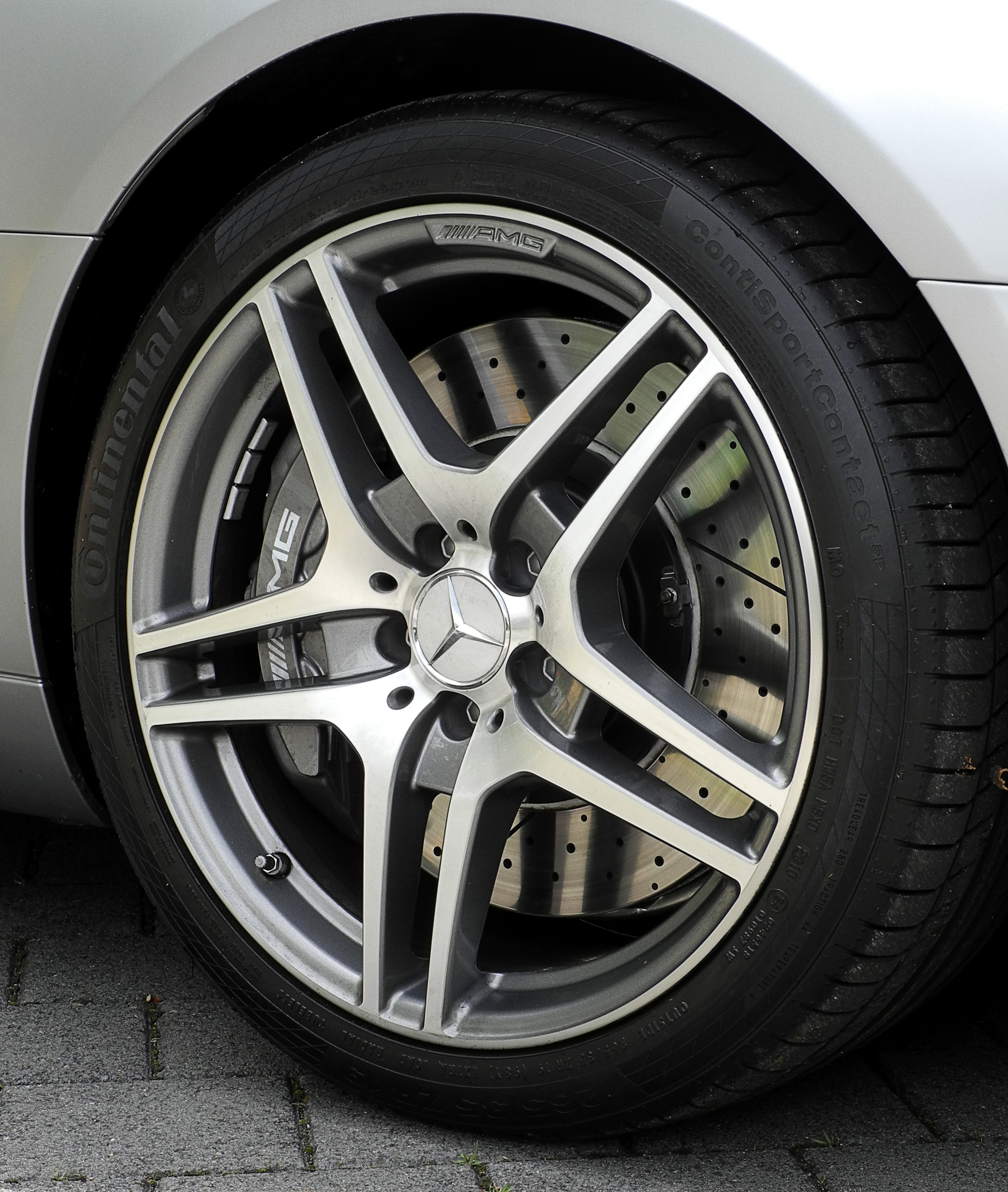
A Continental ContiSportContact 5P tire on a Mercedes-Benz SLS AMG

Continental was founded in 1871 as a rubber manufacturer, Continental-Caoutchouc und Gutta-Percha Compagnie. In 1892, Continental began development and production of pneumatic bicycle tires, which was a major success for the brand. In 1904, Continental became the first company in the world to manufacture grooved vehicle tires. Another major product Continental invented was a detachable wheel tire that was made for touring vehicles (1905). From about 1910, synthetic rubber started to play a major role in car tire production, and one of its earliest proponents was chemist Albert Gerlach (1858–1918), member of the executive board. In the late 1920s, Continental merged with several other major rubber industry companies to form the largest rubber company in Germany called Continental Gummi-Werke AG.

=== Nazi era ===
When the Nazis came to power in Germany in 1933, all members of the board of management as well as the authorized signatories and directors of the second management level were obliged to join the Nazi Party, the works council was purged of "opponents of the regime," and all Jewish members of the supervisory board were forced to resign. As early as the end of 1933, the executive board said Continental was now "a Christian and purely German company".

As with many other German companies during World War II, Continental used slave labor provided by the Nazi Party in their factories in the 1940s at Hannover-Stöcken, Hannover-Limmer, Hannover-Ahlem, and others, all offshoots of the Neuengamme concentration camp.

=== Post-war ===
In close collaboration with Daimler-Benz and Porsche, Continental repeated its prewar successes on the race track in the 1950s. Racing in cars fitted with Continental tires, drivers such as Karl Kling, Stirling Moss and Juan Manuel Fangio won the 1952 Carrera Panamericana and the French, British, Dutch and Italian Grand Prix.

In 1967, Continental opened the Contidrom tire testing facility.

The takeover of the European tire operations of Uniroyal, Inc., USA, gave Continental a wider base in Europe in 1979. The acquisition of the North American tire manufacturer General Tire, Inc. made Continental a global company.

In 2001, Continental acquired a controlling interest in Temic, DaimlerChrysler's automotive-electronics business, which is now part of Continental Automotive Systems. The company also purchased German automotive rubber and plastics company Phoenix AG in 2004, and the automotive electronics unit of Motorola in 2006. Continental acquired Siemens VDO from Siemens in 2007. Also in 2007, the company began to construct a plant in Costa Rica to produce powertrain components for North America. The plant was to open in two phases and ultimately employ 550 workers.

In 2008, Continental appeared overextended with its integration of VDO and had since lost almost half of its market capitalisation when it found itself to be the hostile takeover target of the family-owned Schaeffler. By 2009, Schaeffler successfully installed the head of its motor division at the helm of Continental.

Continental was ranked third in global original equipment manufacturer automotive parts sales in 2012 according to a study sponsored by PricewaterhouseCoopers. On 6 September 2012, Continental returned to the benchmark DAX index of 30 selected German blue chip stocks after a 45-month absence. IHO Group (investment holding of the Schaeffler family) is the controlling shareholder and currently owns 46% of Continental shares. In November 2018, Continental purchased Kmart Tyre & Auto Service in Australia from Wesfarmers for A$350 million.

In 2017 Continental signed a partnership to be the Tour de France official tire sponsor until 2027.

In 2021 Continental spun off its Powertrain division as Vitesco Technologies, which began trading on the Frankfurt Stock Exchange in September 2021.

In 2025 Continental completed the spin-off of its Automotive group sector as Aumovio, which debuted on the Frankfurt Stock Exchange in September 2025 with a market valuation of approximately €4.1 billion. As part of the spin-off, former subsidiaries including Continental Automotive Systems and VDO became part of Aumovio and are no longer part of Continental AG.

On 1 January 2026 Christian Kötz was appointed CEO of Continental AG, succeeding Nikolai Setzer (who served until 31 December 2025). Kötz had previously served as Member of the Executive Board responsible for Group Sector Tires since March 2019.

In August 2025 Roland Welzbacher was appointed CFO of Continental AG.

In February 2026 Continental completed the sale of its OESL business unit. The sale of ContiTech is planned for 2026.

== Schaeffler takeover ==
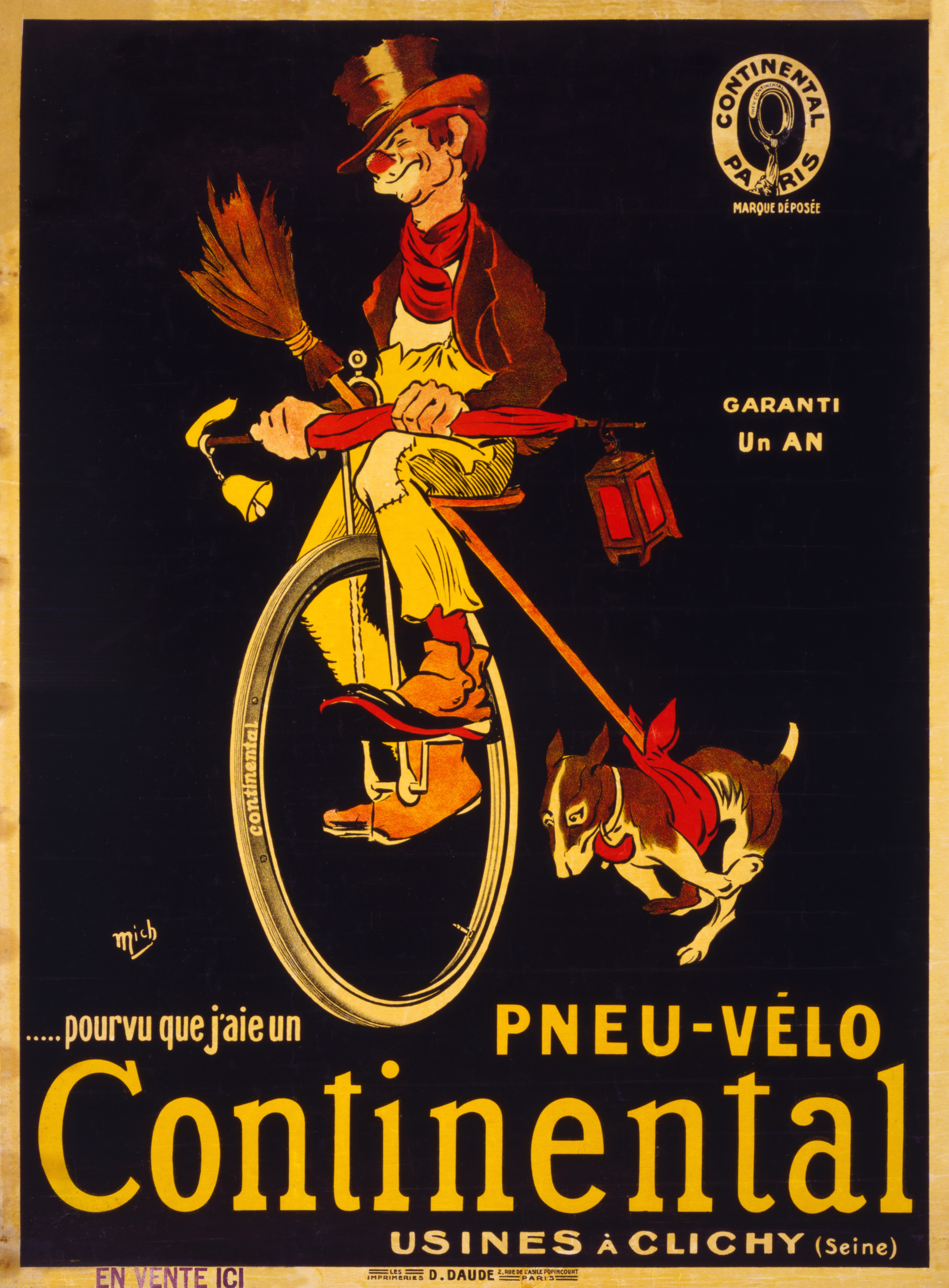
Continental bicycle tire print ad, France, c. 1900

When Continental decided to purchase ITT Industries' brake and chassis business for US$1.93 billion in 1998, the head of ITT's brake division, Juergen M. Geissinger, was hired as the CEO of the family-owned bearing and auto parts manufacturer Schaeffler Group.

Ten years later, Geissinger returned to Continental with mother-and-son owners Maria-Elisabeth and Georg Schaeffler and a consortium of banks, to buy control of the company. Continental appeared to have overextended itself with the acquisition of Siemens' VDO automotive unit in 2007 for €11.4 billion and had lost almost half of its market capitalisation since.

In August 2008 and after a protracted standoff, Continental agreed to be taken over by the Schaeffler Group in a deal that valued the company at approximately €12 billion. Schaeffler in return agreed to limit its position to less than 50% for a period of four years and support Continental's ongoing strategy. This arrangement was overseen by former German Chancellor Gerhard Schroeder. Continental's CEO Manfred Wennemer, who had opposed Schaeffler's offer, resigned and was succeeded by Karl-Thomas Neumann on 1 September 2008. Less than one year later, Schaeffler's CEO Juergen Geissinger succeeded in installing his longtime confidant (and former leader and later head of ITT Teves/Continental Brake and Chassis Division) Elmar Degenhart, the head of his automotive division, as the new chief executive of Continental, ousting Neumann. At Continental's 2013 annual shareholder meeting, Schaeffler gave notice that it will terminate its mutual investment agreement with Continental in May 2014, on which Elmar Degenhart commented, "Notice of termination of the investment agreement is understandable from the vantage point of Schaeffler, our anchor shareholder. We are confident that the two companies will continue their very good and goal-oriented cooperation on into the future."

== Tire manufacturing ==
Continental manufactures tires in Europe, the Americas, Asia and South Africa. Its are located in Korbach, Germany; Lousado, Portugal; Otrokovice, Czech Republic; Púchov, Slovakia; Mount Vernon, Illinois, United States; Hefei, China; and Rayong, Thailand.

Continental's largest tire factory in Europe by production capacity is in Otrokovice, Czech Republic. In 2025, it employed more than 5,400 people and had annual capacity for up to 19 million passenger-car tires and more than one million truck and industrial tires.

The Púchov plant in Slovakia manufactures passenger-car, light commercial vehicle and truck tires. Tire production began there in 1950, and the plant employed more than 5,000 people in 2025. The site also houses a technology center within Continental's global tire research and development network, employing more than 300 development engineers.

== Continental Tire the Americas, LLC ==
Continental Tire entered the North American tire industry with its 1987 purchase of General Tire from GenCorp, Inc., forming Continental General Tire Corp. At the time, Continental was following other tire manufacturers, such as Bridgestone and Michelin, into the American tire market.

The headquarters for North and South American tire divisions is located in the Charlotte metropolitan area at Lancaster County, South Carolina, United States (with a Fort Mill, South Carolina mailing address). The North American headquarters of the CAS division is located in Auburn Hills, Michigan, directly east of the Great Lakes Crossing Mall. Continental also has a research and development arm in the tech-heavy Silicon Valley, where, among other things, the company focuses on developing technologies supporting autonomous driving vehicles.

From 2002 through 2005, the subsidiary sponsored a new college football bowl game in Charlotte, North Carolina, known for three playings as the Continental Tire Bowl at Bank of America Stadium. At the time, Continental was a major employer in Charlotte. However, as financial woes set in at the division Meineke Car Care Center took over sponsorship of the Charlotte bowl game from Continental. The first two Continental Tire Bowls were both won by Virginia; the third and final (by that name) edition of the bowl was won by Boston College.

The subsidiary announced that effective 1 January 2006, it would implement massive cuts on health care for retirees across the country. After a class-action lawsuit, the company and United Steelworkers union, representing the retirees, agreed to a settlement whereby the company would continue to fund benefits. Later that year, it announced it would cease tire production in Charlotte and would close its tire production plant in Mayfield, Kentucky.

In 2011, CTA announced that it would build a plant in Sumter, South Carolina. The plant will cost about US$500 million and employ 1,600 workers by 2020.

In February 2016, CTA announced that it would build a Commercial Tire plant in Clinton, Mississippi, with an investment totaling approximately US$1.4 billion and employing 2,500 people when the plant reaches full capacity in the next decade.

In October 2016, CTA purchased Hoosier Racing Tire.

== Automotive PACE Awards ==
In April 2016, Continental AG together with Honda's U.S. subsidiary, were honored with the 2016 Automotive News PACE Innovation Partnership Award for the Bidirectional Long Range Communications (BLRC) System, developed by the Body and Security Team in the Interior Division. The Radio Frequency Device, helps the car user to operate a remote control key fob from more than half a kilometer away, to start the engine and climate control function, while receiving feedback from the vehicle (such as locked/unlocked). The Radio Frequency System, powered by a single standard coin cell, and an innovative vehicle-mounted RF transceiver, was developed together by Honda and Continental, and was debuted on the Acura MDX in 2013 and was quickly followed by the Acura TLX and Acura RLX in 2014.

In 2015, Continental AG was honored with two PACE Awards for its Bare Die High-Density-Interconnect (BD-HDI) Printed Circuit Board Substrate Technology for Transmission Electronics and its Multi-application Unified Sensor Element (MUSE). In 2018, Continental won a PACE (Premier Automotive Suppliers' Contribution to Excellence) Award for its Digital Micromirror Head-Up Display technology. Along with Audi, Continental also received an Innovation Partnership Award for their Safety Domain Control Unit (SDCU).

In 2020, Continental won an inaugural PACEpilot award for its Virtual A-Pillar technology that helps to eliminate forward blind spots. PACEpilot is an offshoot of the long-standing PACE awards, and the programmes seeks to recognise innovations in automative technology that have moved to the working model phase of testing.

== Executive management ==
=== Chief Executive Officer ===
- 1973–1981: Carl Hahn
- 1982–1987: Helmut Werner
- 1987–1991: Horst W. Urban
- 1991–1999: Hubertus von Grünberg
- 1999–2001: Stephan Kessel
- 2001–2008: Manfred Wennemer
- 2008–2009: Karl-Thomas Neumann
- 2009–30 November 2020: Elmar Degenhart
- 2020–31 December 2025: Nikolai Setzer
- 2026–present: Christian Kötz

=== Chairman of the Board ===
- Unknown–1989: Alfred Herrhausen
- 1990–1999: Ulrich Weiss
- 1999–2009: Hubertus von Grünberg
- 2009–2009: Rolf Koerfer (6 March–28 September)
- 2009–2026: Wolfgang Reitzle
- 2026–present: Sabrina Soussan

=== Supervisory board ===
- Sabrina Soussan (chair)
- Hassan Allak*
- Dr. Kevin Borck*
- Dorothea von Boxberg
- Francesco Grioli*
- Satish Khatu
- Isabel Corinna Knauf
- Sabine Kühn*
- Sabine Neuß
- Prof. Dr. Rolf Nonnenmacher
- Klaus Rosenfeld
- Georg F. W. Schaeffler
- Jörg Schönfelder*
- Matthias Tote*
- Nicole Werner*

Note: '*' denotes labor representative.

== Acquisition of Veyance Technologies, Inc. ==
Continental AG has acquired the American rubber company Veyance Technologies, Inc. based in Fairlawn, Ohio. Veyance will be integrated into the company's ContiTech division, and will serve as the regional home office for ContiTech in North America.

The Brazilian antitrust authority Council for Economic Defence (CADE) made it official on 29 January 2015, described in a press release on the 30th, from the company. The total transition was US$1.6 billion. The company will divest Veyance's NAFTA air springs business in Mexico and its Brazilian steel-cord belting business in response to some of the concerns raised by antitrust authorities, the release said, employing about 600 people work in those operations.
