= Maria-Elisabeth Schaeffler =

German businesswoman, heiress and billionaire

- Born: 17 August 1941 (age 85); Prague, Czech Republic
- Occupation: Schaeffler Group
- Spouses: Georg Schaeffler (m. 1963–1996) Jürgen Thumann (m. 2014)
- Children: Georg F. W. Schaeffler

Maria-Elisabeth Schaeffler (born 17 August 1941) is a German businesswoman and one of the owners of Schaeffler Group, one of the world's largest producers of rolling bearings. The other owner is her son Georg F. W. Schaeffler.

== Early life ==
Schaeffler was born in Prague in 1941, which was then in the Protectorate of Bohemia and Moravia, and grew up in Vienna, Austria.

== Career ==
In 1963, Schaeffler married Georg Schaeffler, and moved to Herzogenaurach in Franconia, which is located within Bavaria. It was through Schaeffler's marriage that she would come to work for Schaeffler Group AG. In 1996 Georg died, and she took the reins of the family business.

It has been Schaeffler's legacy to continue with her husband's life's work, growing the family business, Schaeffler Group AG. Since 1996 Schaeffler has led her company through multiple acquisitions, including: INA, LUK, and FAG. These three companies in particular are large brand name corporations in making rolling bearings. These three acquisitions have made Schaeffler Group AG one of the largest producers of rolling bearings and linear motion products in the World.

In 1999, Schaeffler led the acquisition of the remaining shares of LuK, a clutch manufacturer, obtaining 50% of the shares of the company for Schaeffler Group AG. Schaeffler Group already owned 50% of the LuK shares. In 2001 she led the acquisition of FAG Kugelfischer Georg Schäfer AG Schweinfurt, with the acquisitions of FAG and INA, Schaeffler Group AG had become the second largest producer of rolling bearings in the World. In 2009 Schaeffler Group purchased a significant share of the company Continental AG.

Since 1996, Schaeffler Group AG has seen an increase in annual turnover and employment. By 2013 the annual turnover reached approximately 10 billion euros, and the employment tripled to over 70,000 employees.

== Political activities ==
Schaeffler served as a CSU delegate to the Federal Convention for the purpose of electing the President of Germany in 2004. During the Hannover Messe in April 2016, she was among the 15 German corporate leaders who were invited to a private dinner with President Barack Obama.

== Other activities ==
=== Corporate boards ===
- Deloitte Germany, Member of the advisory board (2009–2018)
- Austrian State and Industrial Holding (ÖIAG), Member of the supervisory board (2008–2014)
- Deutsche Bank, Member of the European Advisory Board (2005–2014)
- BayernLB, Member of the supervisory board (-2014)
- Nürnberger Lebensversicherung AG, Member of the supervisory board (2012–2013)

=== Non-profit-organizations ===
- Deutsches Museum, Member of the Board of Trustees
- Mozarteum University of Salzburg, Member of the Advisory Board
- Salzburg Easter Festival, Member of the Board of Trustees
- Konzertgesellschaft München, Member of the Board of Trustees (2002–2018)

== Recognition ==
Schaeffler has been given many awards and accolades, including the following:

- 2001 - Cross of Merit with Ribbon of the Order of Merit of the Federal Republic of Germany
- 2001 - Medal of Honor by the Nuremberg Chamber of Commerce for the Mid-Franconian region
- 2002 - Honorary citizen of the town of Höchstadt/Aisch
- 2003 - Bavarian Order of Merit
- 2004 - "Family Entrepreneur of the Year" award, presented by the economics magazine "impulse" and the "INTES Akademie für Familienunternehmen" (INTES Academy for Family-Owned Companies)
- 2005 - Honorary Member of the Senate of the Transylvania University of Brasov, Romania
- 2005 - Honorary citizen of the town of Jeonju, Jeollabuk-Do province, Korea
- 2006 - Honorary citizen of the town of Herzogenaurach Entry in the "Golden Book" of the Erlangen-Höchstadt district
- 2007 - Large Silver Medal with Star for Services to the Republic of Austria
- 2007 - 1st Class Cross of Merit of the Order of Merit of the Federal Republic of Germany
- 2007 - Karmarsch Medal
- 2011 - "Großer Tiroler Adler" medal
- 2011 - "Personality of the Year" award presented by the ÖkoGlobe-Institut of Duisburg-Essen University
- 2012 - "Gold medal of the District" for the Erlangen-Höchstadt district
- 2013 - "Family Entrepreneur of the Year award, 2012", selected by a jury of representatives of German industry and Handelsblatt

== Misuse of her name in scam activities ==
There are many reported cases of advance-fee scam where fraudulous emails are sent to the recipient claiming that Maria-Elisabeth Schaeffler wanted to donate them a high sum of money.
