= Hotzendorf =

Hotzendorf may refer to:

- Hodslavice, a Czech village whose German name is Hotzendorf
- Franz Conrad von Hötzendorf, an Austrian general
