= Vladimír Karfík =

Czech architect

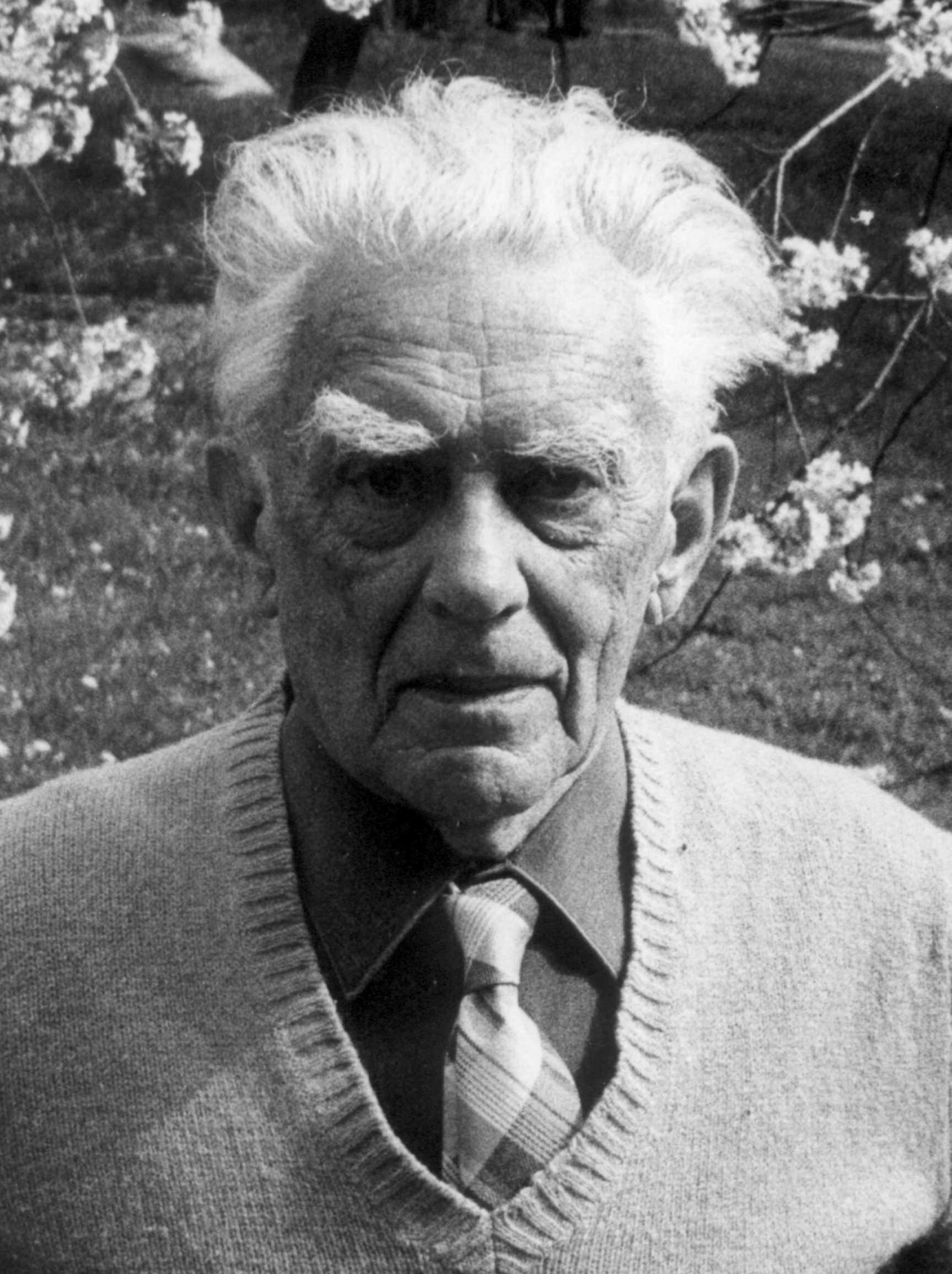

Dean of the Faculty of Architecture and Civil Engineering of SVŠT
- Preceded by: Emanuel Hruška
- Succeeded by: Ján Svetlík
- In office 1956–1958

Personal details
- Born: 26 October 1901 Idrija, Austria-Hungary (now Slovenia)
- Died: 6 June 1996 (aged 94) Brno, Czech Republic
- Education: Faculty of Architecture of Czech Technical University in Prague
- Occupation: architect, university professor

Vladimir Karfík (26 October 1901 – 6 June 1996) was a Czech modernist architect and university professor. His life, professional career and his work reflected changes characteristic for the 20th century.

== Career ==
Karfík worked with many prominent creators of modern architecture all over the world. His architecture in all periods of his life is direct and unembellished. It represented function, construction, and economy in architectural form. Among other works, he designed Baťa's Skyscraper in Zlín. Karfík was one of a number of Czech architects to design the "Bata houses" and Bata shoe factory at East Tilbury, England.

== Gallery ==
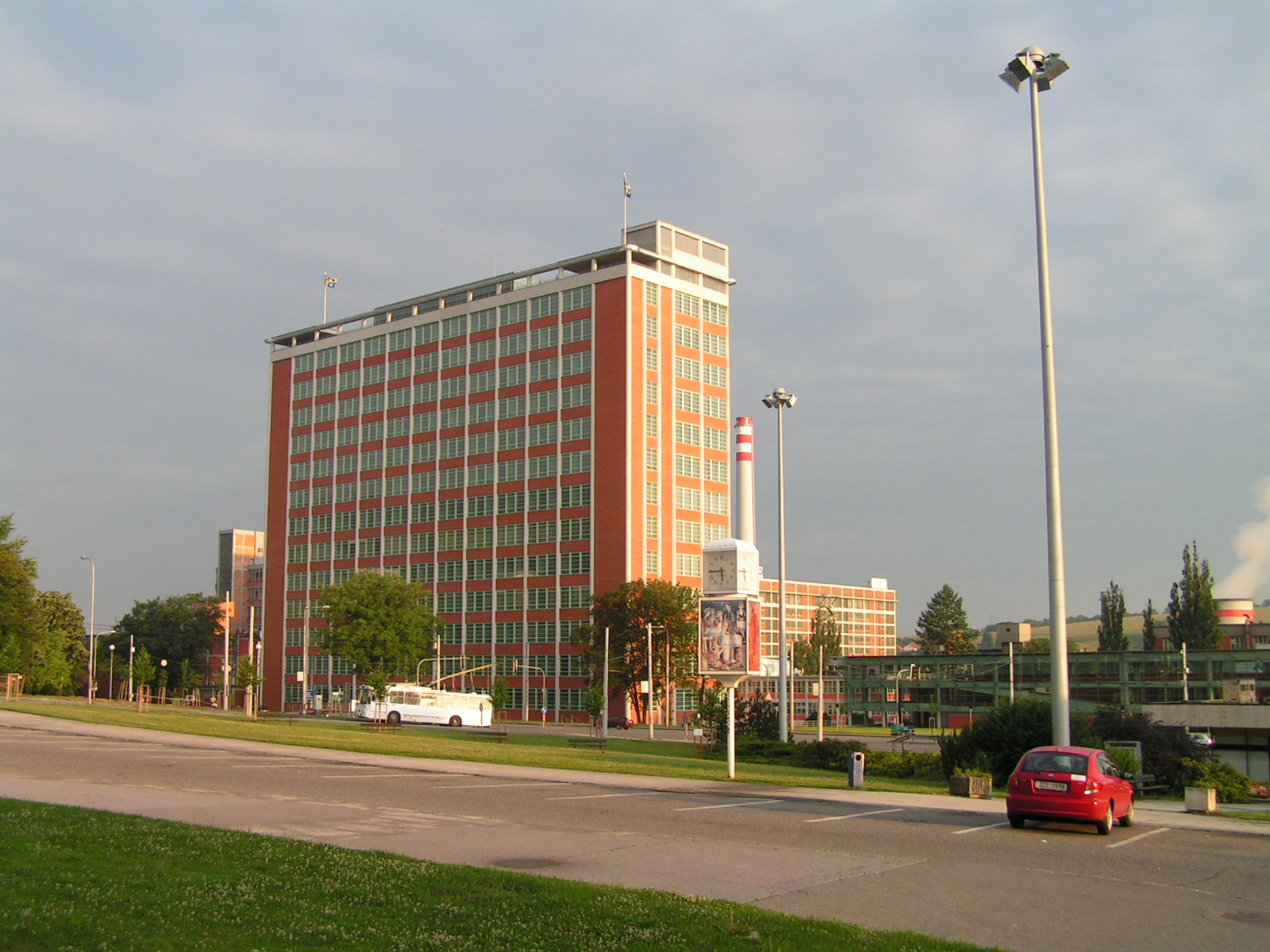
Baťa's Skyscraper, 19

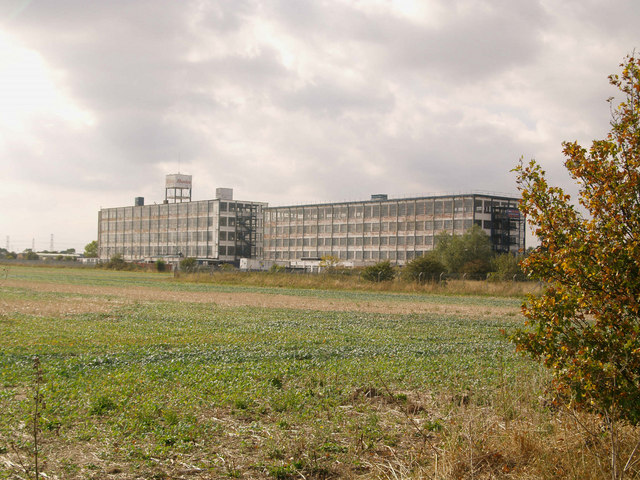
Bata shoe factory
