= Josef Hromádka =

Czech Protestant theologian (1889–1969)

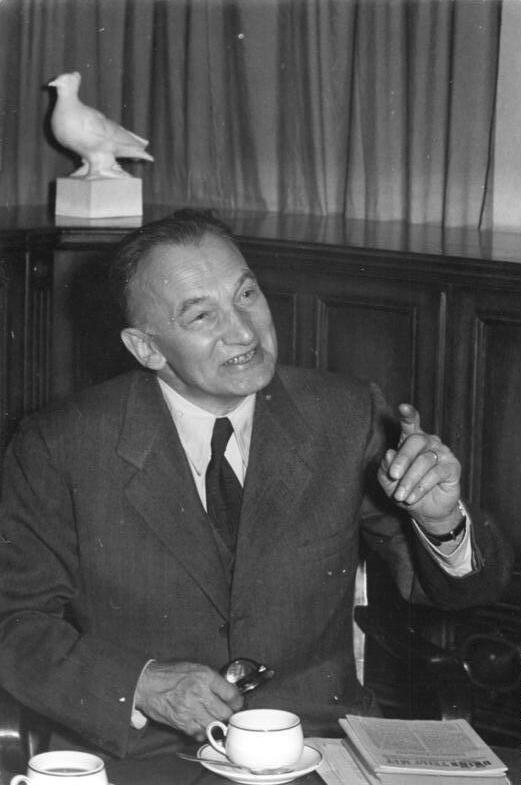
Bundesarchiv Bild 183-10342-0001, Prof. Hromatka besucht CDU-Vorstand

Josef Lukl Hromádka (8 June 1889 in Hodslavice – 26 December 1969 in Prague) was a Czech Protestant theologian. He was a founder of the Christian Peace Conference.

Born into a Lutheran peasant family in a village in Moravia in the Austro-Hungarian Empire, Hromádka studied theology in Vienna, Basel and Heidelberg, as well as in Aberdeen. He was a supporter of and member from its foundation in 1918 of the unified Evangelical Church of Czech Brethren.

In 1939 Hromádka fled the Nazis into exile, taking up a post at Princeton Theological Seminary in the United States. He returned to Prague in 1947 to resume his post at the Comenius theological faculty.

A founder of the Christian Peace Conference, he called the 1968 Soviet-led invasion of Czechoslovakia 'the greatest tragedy of my life'. He left the movement in November 1968.

== Literature ==
- http://journals.ptsem.edu/id/PSB1999201/dmd008 Tribute by Jan Milic Lochmann, The Princeton Seminary Bulletin, 1999
