= Baťa's Skyscraper =

Skyscraper in Zlín, Czechia

Coordinates: 49°13′23.66″N 17°39′29.87″E

- Baťův mrakodrap
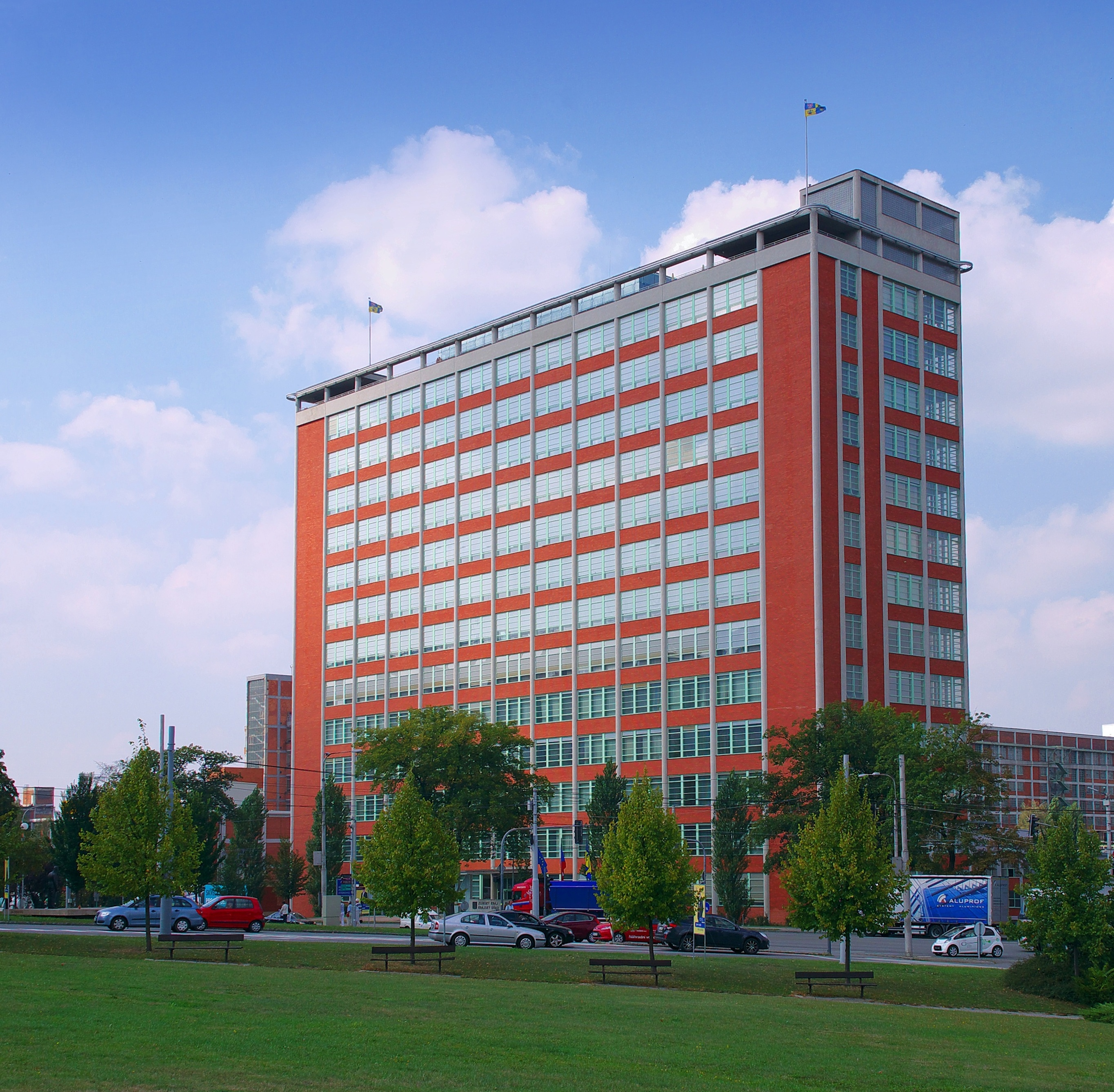
- Baťa's Skyscraper after the reconstruction in 2004.

General information
- Status: Completed
- Location: Zlín, Czech Republic
- Construction started: 1936
- Completed: 1938
- Opening: 1938

Height
- Roof: 77.5 m (254 ft)

Technical details
- Floor count: 16

Design and construction
- Architect: Vladimír Karfík

Baťa's Skyscraper (Czech: Baťův mrakodrap), also known as Building No. 21, is a skyscraper in Zlín, Czechia. It is 77.5 metres high and has sixteen floors. It was the administration building of Bata Shoes, a company that was based in the city. Now it is headquarters of the Zlín Region.

This building was one of the first high-rise buildings to be constructed in Europe: it was the third-tallest pre-war skyscraper after Madrid's Telefónica Building and Antwerp's Boerentoren. The building is in the style of Constructivist architecture, designed by Vladimír Karfík. It was built between 1936 and 1938 at the direction of company president Jan Antonín Baťa, who took over following the death of his half-brother Tomáš Baťa.

Originally, the administration offices were to be concentrated in three interconnected three-story buildings. Architect Karfík suggested the design of a high-rise building and eventually got Jan Antonín Baťa's support for his idea.

== Construction ==
The general contractor was a subsidiary of the Baťa concern – Zlínská stavební akciová společnost. Arnošt Sehnal was the chief builder. Parties involved:

- Václav Zeman – in charge of concrete work
- Alfons Hübner – in charge of statics calculations and of the reinforced concrete structures design
- Jan Vojta – in charge of plumbing
- Josef Zavřel – in charge of electrical installations
- Maximilian John and his advisory team were in charge of the air conditioning.

The construction started on 14 September 1936 with the excavation of the foundation footings. The construction of reinforced concrete skeleton started next year in April and the sixteenth floor was completed on 16 September 1937. The technical equipment was built between 1938 and 1939. According to photographs dated from 1940, the building was fully operational in 1940.

Total costs were CZK 8,810,410. This does not include the cost of the interior furnishings, which were paid for by the individual departments.

== Statistics ==
The total built-up area is 1,850 m^{2}. The building is 80 m long and 20 m wide. The total floor area is 30,000 m^{2}, the usable area is 24,000 m^{2} (80% of the total floor area). The total enclosed space (cubic capacity) is 135,000 m^{3}.

During construction, the following quantities of materials were used:

- 5,000 tons of cement
- 10,000 m^{3} of gravel
- 1,200 tons of steel
- 28,000 m^{2} of glass
- 15,000,000 liters of water

The construction material was hauled on a total of 3,800 wagons. 8,400 m^{3} of soil was excavated to make room for the basement. The overall plastered area covers 40,000 m^{2}.

The support system is formed by a reinforced concrete skeleton with characteristic cylindrical columns, which are spirally reinforced. The column foot takes on an elliptical shape to optimally distribute the horizontal load. The central pillars have a diameter of 75 cm in the foundation, each bearing a load of 500 tons. The skeleton was built by 40 workers in 160 days.

The building, despite its length of 80 m, does not have continuous expansion joints. They are only used to divide the last two floors due to thermal expansion. The peripheral masonry is bricked out of ordinary solid bricks and lined with brick tiles measuring 6.5 × 30 cm.

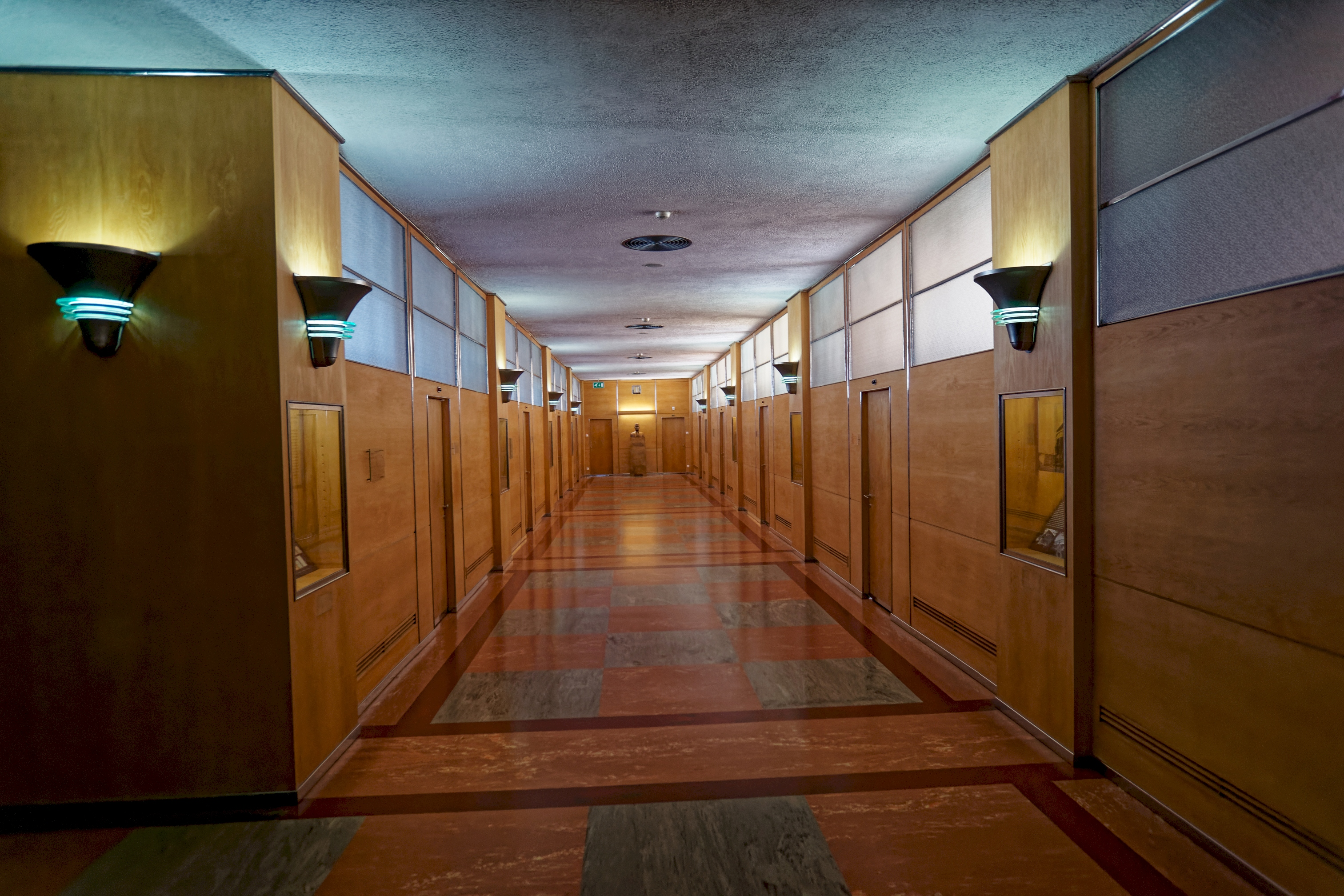
Baťa's Skyscraper – 8th floor

== Description ==
In the basement there was the central company archive, the engine room and the electrical substation, warehouses and two telephone exchanges. On the ground floor there was a large assembly hall. On floors 1 though 14 there was a large office space to accommodate 200 workers. The eighth floor was occupied by the company management. On the 15th floor there was a conference hall occasionally used for product demonstrations. Upstairs was a rooftop observation garden with flower beds and a fountain. From the technical point of view, the building was carried out at the highest technical level of the possibilities at that time.

=== Elevators ===
All vertical communication routes were located outside the basic building layout. There were four liftboy-operated elevators used by the staff (with a total capacity of 100 seats). The high number of elevators ensured that the cabin arrived within a maximum of 30 seconds of being called. The elevator speed was 2 m/s. There was also an express elevator (intended for company visitors) which traveled at speeds of up to 3.2 m/s.

Two adjacent floors were connected with a paternoster lift with 31 cabins.

The building also had a freight elevator, and an elevator for post delivery. A garbage and paper chute was also an integral part of the building.

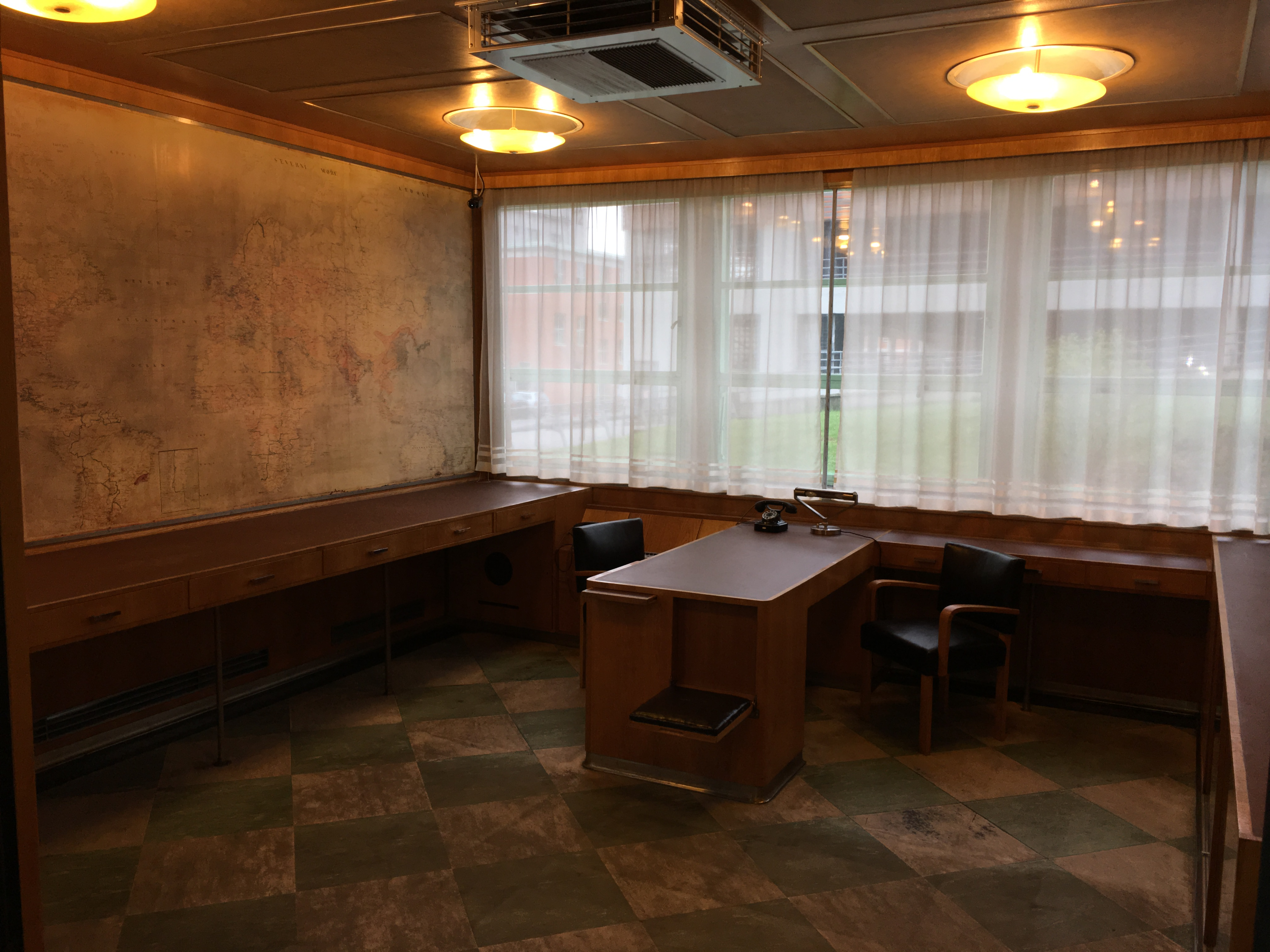
Baťa's office

==== Baťa's office ====
A technical rarity is the air conditioned lift office of the company director measuring 6 × 6 meters. It is equipped with a separate alarm device (including automatic fire alarm and door opening), a telephone and a washbasin. There is still the original floor cover Zlinolit on the elevator floor. The office elevator moved at 0.75 m/s.

It was completed during World War II after J. A. Baťa relocated abroad so he did not have a chance to use it.

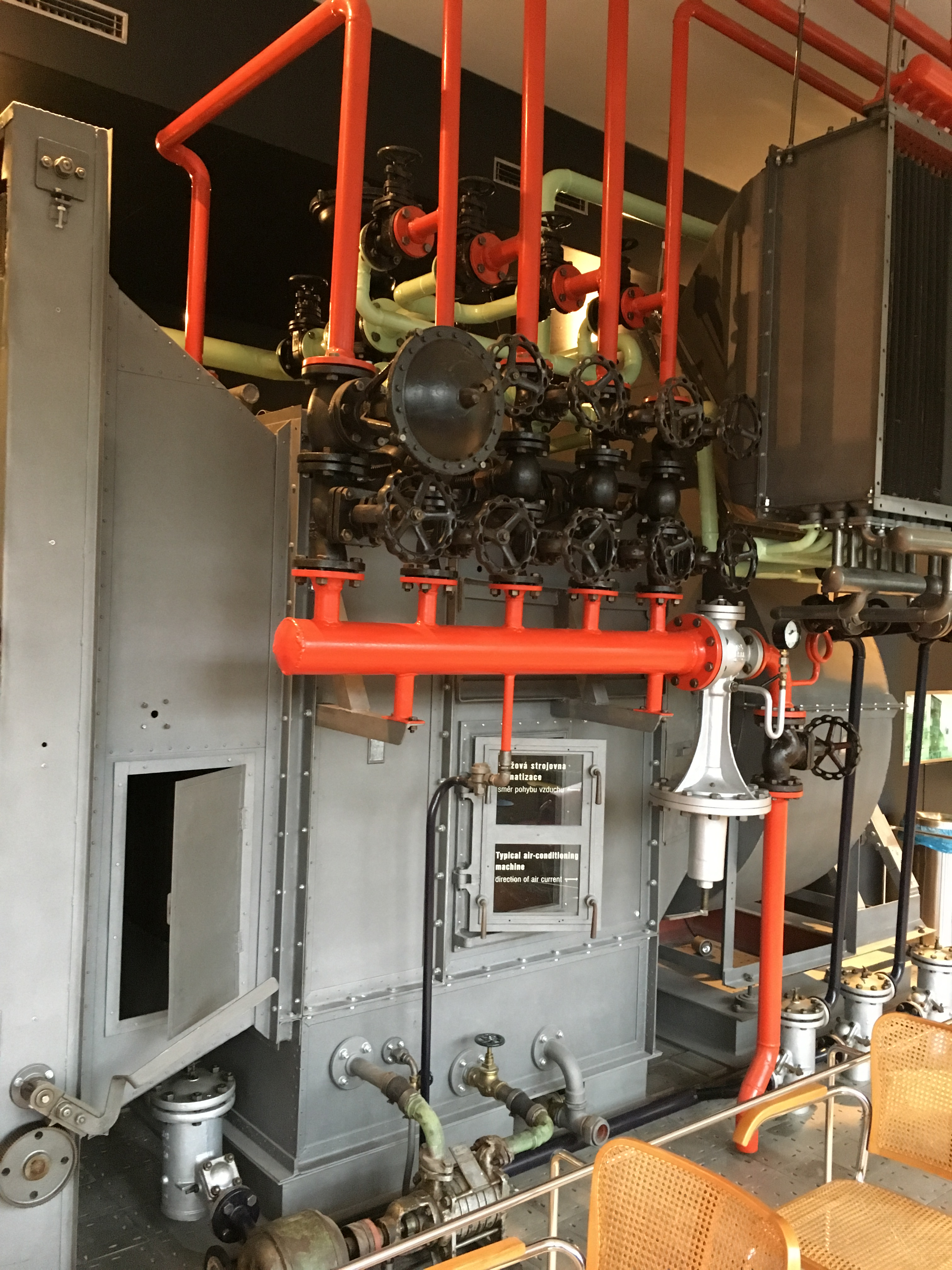
Engine room

=== Heating ===
Each floor had its own heating and air conditioning controls independent of the rest of the building. The temperature and humidity setting was adjusted per floor. Each floor had its own engine room maintaining the air quality. The whole building was connected to the factory steam pipeline. Temperatures of tap and fountain water were managed centrally.

The windows are unopenable, washable from the outside with the help of an elevator cage, suspended at the top of a rail ledge.

== History ==
In November 1944 Zlín was bombarded, but Baťa's skyscraper miraculously escaped destruction.

In 1959 the ground floor was adapted for the Shoe Museum.

In 1960 a showroom was built on the roof terrace.

During the sixties, the southern entrance to the building was completed. Unfortunately, the outcome was not eye pleasing due to a cumbersome awning supported by a concrete wall with a sculpture (by J. Vlach) and a fountain [3]. At the same time the elevators, interior doors and some other elements were refurbished.

In 2004 the building underwent a significant restoration, which cost CZK 630 million. Since then it is the seat of the Regional Office of the Zlín Region (its offices are located on the 9th to the 15th floors) and the local tax office (its offices are on the 4th to the 8th floors).

In 2018 some building areas received a face lift totalling 84 million CZK. 10,000 m^{2} of floor cover Zlinolit were restored, the permanent exhibitions were expanded (among others a giant bronze model of old Zlín was installed), the elevators and the paternoster were repaired, the entry hall was modernized.

On the second floor there is a permanent exhibition about the building history and about its architect Vladimír Karfík.

The third floor houses a restaurant and a buffet.

There is a café and a viewing platform on the top-floor terrace.

== Awards ==
In 1958 the building earned the cultural monument of the Czech Republic status (it is listed under number 1894).

During the exhibition Ten Centuries of Architecture, which took place in Prague Castle in 2000, the building was ranked among the eight most important monuments of the Czech 20th century architecture.

The restored building won the prestigious Grand Prix of the Architect Community for 2004.

A gold coin issued by the Czech Mint in 2018 depicts Bata's Skyscraper.
