= Svatopluk Turek =

Svatopluk Turek (25 October 1900 in Hodslavice – 30 December 1972 in Zlín) was a Czech novelist, known under the pen name T. Svatopluk.

After studying art at the university, he worked as graphic designer for the Bata shoe company in Zlín. He is best known for his book Botostroj (The Shoe Machine), in which he depicted the company as an inhuman mechanism destroying the lives of people and its boss Tomáš Baťa as a dictator. The novel is written in very fast, expressive language.

The family of Tomáš Baťa sued for defamation and tried in various ways to stop publication of the book.

== Works ==
- Botostroj (The Shoe Machine), 1933
- Bez šéfa (Without the Boss), a sequel after the company was nationalized
- Mrtví země
- Andělé úspěchu
- Gordonův trust žaluje (also titled Pán a spisovatel)
- Hrdinové z ostrova
- Švédský mramor

== See also ==
Bata shoe factory (East Tilbury)
