= Tomas Bata Memorial =

Coordinates: 49.2191°N 17.6658°E

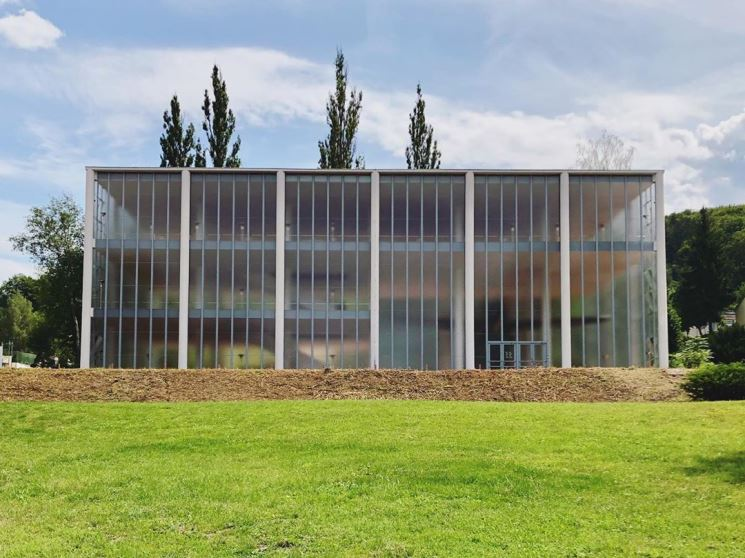
- Interactive map of the Tomas Bata Memorial area

General information
- Type: memorial
- Architectural style: functionalism
- Location: nám. T. G. Masaryka 2570, Zlín, Czech Republic
- Completed: 1933

Design and construction
- Architect: František Lydie Gahura

Website
- https://pamatnikbata.eu/

Tomas Bata Memorial (Czech: Památník Tomáše Bati) is functionalist building in Zlín, Czech Republic built in 1933. The Memorial was designed by the Czech architect František Lydie Gahura.

== History ==
Tomas Bata Memorial is the most impressive architectural work of František Lydie Gahura, it is a modern paraphrase of the constructions of high gothic style period: the supporting system and colourful stained glass and the reinforced concrete skeleton and glass. The building process started in 1932 and the monument was open with ceremony on the day of the first anniversary of Tomáš Baťa death that is on 12 July 1933. Based on the proposals by František Lydie Gahura the monument was meant to be an entrance gate to a complex of four buildings of the learning institute. Between 1936 and 1939 only the Learning Institute I and II were built. In 1954 the monument was rebuilt (academic architect J. Staša) and turned into the House of Arts. Later to be used as an art gallery and philharmonic orchestra in Zlín. But, after 1989, Zlín gradually cast off the inheritance of Communism. The philharmonic and the art gallery were moved to better-suited spaces, and the building on the slope of "Gahura Avenue" began waiting for its new use. Following a society-wide discussion inspired by an idea from the British theorist Kenneth Frampton, an architecture teacher at Columbia University in New York, the decision was made. The building underwent a two-year renovation led by the architect Petr Všetečka and was reintroduced to the public in 2018 in its authentic appearance from the 1930s under the name "The Tomáš Baťa Memorial". Since 2019, this space has been accessible all year round in the form of guided tours.

== Architecture ==
Tomas Bata Memorial is the most valuable monument of the Zlín functionalism. The idea for the monument is simple – an empty prism placed on a visible spot above the town on the central axis of the ascending park space, made up of several modules of the Zlín 6.15 x 6.15 m frame and clad only with cathedral glass. Inside is Junkers F 13 aircraft in which Tomáš Baťa died in 1932. Gahura reduced the monument to three basic materials of Zlín architecture – concrete, steel and glass. Building's composition express the unique attributes of Tomáš Baťa: generosity, clarity, aspiration, optimism, simplicity and honesty.

== Gallery ==
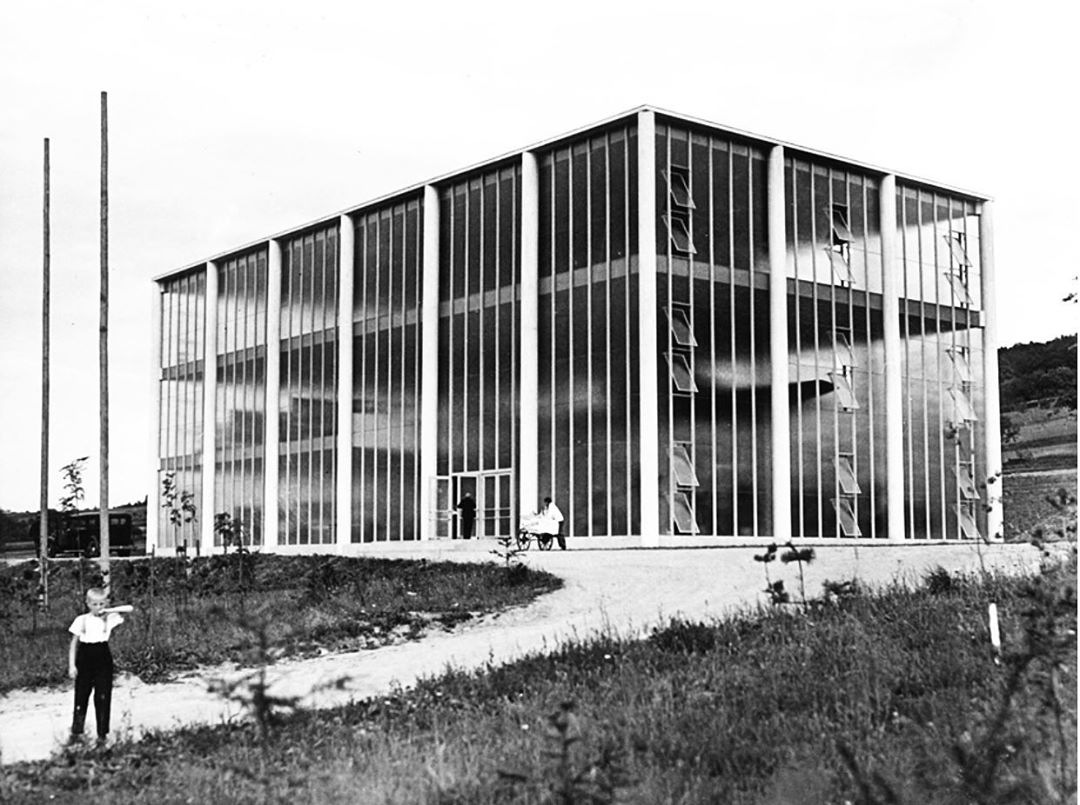
History image of the Tomas Bata Memorial

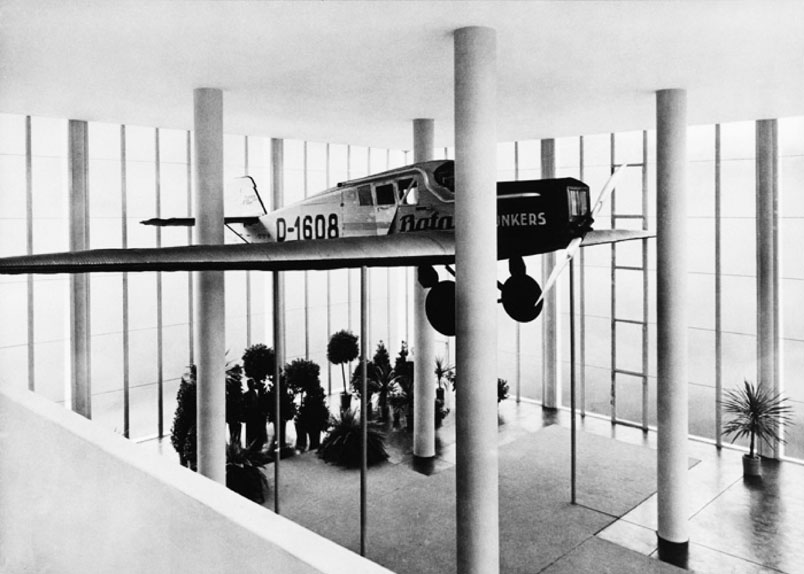
Junkers F 13 aircraft

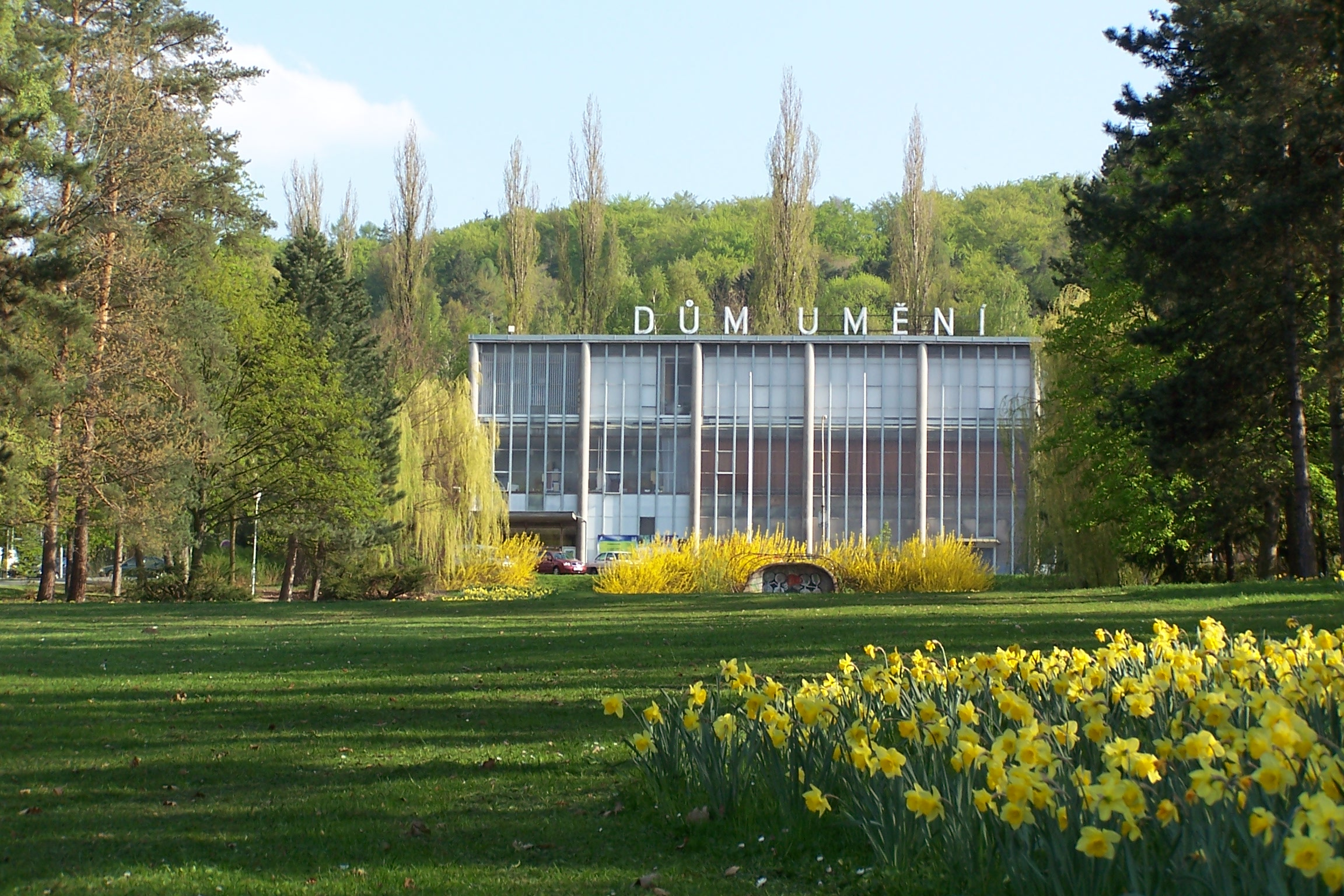
House of Arts in Zlin (before reconstruction)
