= Bata shoe factory =

Factory in East Tilbury, England

Coordinates: 51°28′47.19″N 0°25′4.33″E

Bata Shoe Factory (East Tilbury)
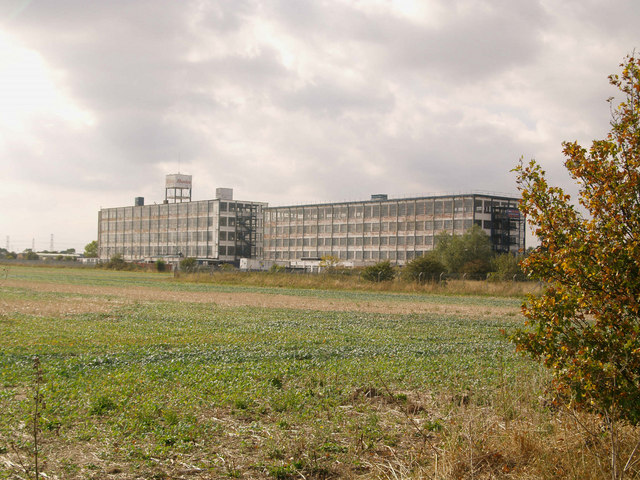
- Bata Shoe Factory in East Tilbury, UK
- Built: 1932; 94 years ago
- Location: Princess Margaret Road, East Tilbury, RM18 1; East Tilbury
- Industry: Footwear
- Products: Shoes
- Employees: 4,000
- Architect: František Lydie Gahura; Vladimír Karfík
- Style: Modernist
- Defunct: 2005; 21 years ago

The Bata shoe factory in East Tilbury is what remains of an industrial estate in Essex, England, which produced shoes for over 70 years. Founded in 1932 by Tomáš Baťa, the factory was "one of the most important planned landscapes in the East of England" in the 20th century. The factory closed in 2005.

== Background ==
Bata Shoes was founded in 1894 by Tomáš Baťa in Zlín (then Austro-Hungarian Empire, today the Czech Republic). After the plea of a Tilbury clergyman to alleviate unemployment during the Great Depression and in part to overcome customs tariffs on foreign products, construction began in 1932 on the Bata shoe factory in East Tilbury.

For the remaining years of the 20th century, the factory was an economic force in the Tilbury area. Designed by Czech architect, it created a unique model of a company town in Britain. Bata's vision was for a whole society, complete with worker housing, schools for their children, and entertainment.

== Architecture ==
In 1933 the first "Bata houses" for workers were built, set among gardens in a chequerboard pattern, which were distinct from the more typical Victorian terraced housing in the area. The factory's architecture "predates" and "perhaps eclipses" other British examples of modernist architecture, such as Highpoint I or the Isokon building, according to The Guardian.

Designed by František Lydie Gahura and other Czech architects, the estate's buildings were constructed of welded steel columns, roof trusses and reinforced concrete walls - very different in style from the typical red-bricked and sloped-roofed terraces of London suburbs. All the social needs of the workforce were met by the factory. What was known as "Bata-ville" had all the services of a normal town, including a theatre, sports facilities, hotel, restaurant, grocery and butcher shops, post office, and its own newspaper.

The Czech architects František Lydie Gahura and Vladimír Karfík were among those who designed the buildings on the site.

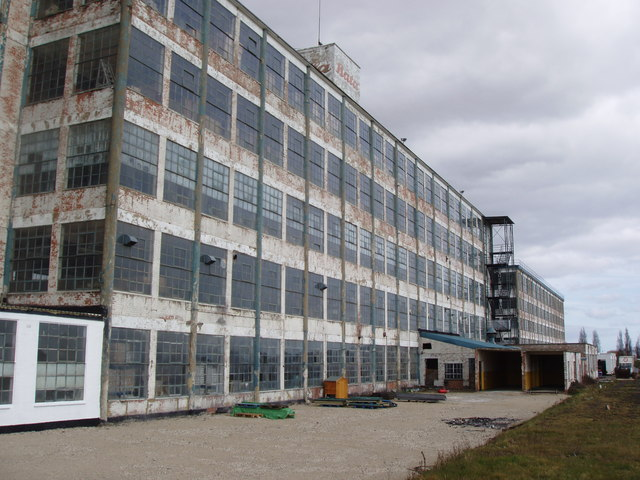
The disused factory in 2006

== World War II ==
The German occupation of Czechoslovakia in 1938 caused turmoil for Bata Shoes generally, but the factory in East Tilbury thrived. "British Bata" was born.

As male factory workers were called to arms, their wives often took over their jobs. While in the armed forces, employees received the company newspaper, the Bata Record, along with food and cigarette parcels. At least 81 Bata employees from the Tilbury factory died in the war. After the war, Bata's home office in Czechoslovakia and other facilities throughout eastern Europe were nationalised by communist regimes.

== Latter years and demise ==
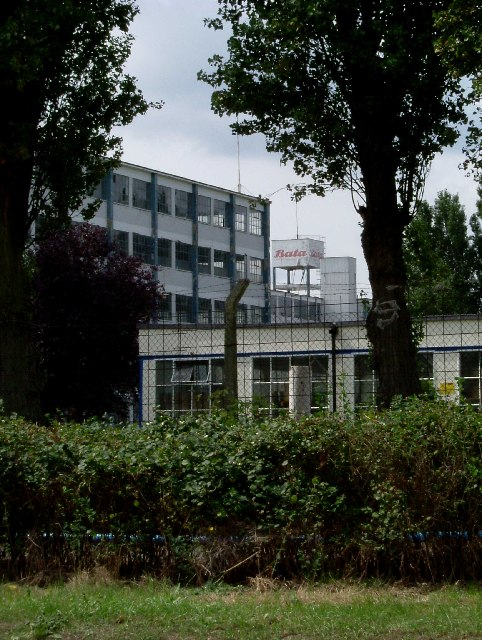
Bata Shoe Works in 2005

The Bata factory in East Tilbury operated for more than 70 years, but in the 1960s, production was gradually shifted to facilities closer to its export markets. Factory downsizing began in the 1980s, and the Bata industrial estate was closed in 2005.

"The East Tilbury (Bata) Conservation Area" was designated in 1993 by Thurrock Council and includes a Grade II listed building.

== Legacy ==
The factory inspired the documentary film Bata-ville: We Are Not Afraid of the Future.

The Bata Reminiscence and Resource Centre at East Tilbury Library was set up to collect the memories of people who lived and worked within the British Bata community.

In June 2011, an interactive trail was launched as an iPhone app known as Thurrock Mobile Explorer. This describes a route around the Bata estate and provides information about the history as well as environment at numbered points.

In October 2016, a site-specific play, Not Afraid of the Future, was developed by East 15 Acting School students about the lives of people who lived and worked in the town surrounding the factory. The play was performed in and around East Tilbury, finishing at the village hall.

== Notable people ==
Jan Tůša, the father of BBC journalist and presenter John Tusa, helped design and build the Tilbury factory. He became managing director of the British Bata company. The Tusa family lived in nearby Horndon on the Hill, from 1939; John Tusa was born in Czechoslovakia.

== See also ==
- Bata Shoe Museum
- Bata Shoes
- Tomáš Baťa
- Svatopluk Turek
