= František Lydie Gahura =

Czech architect and sculptor

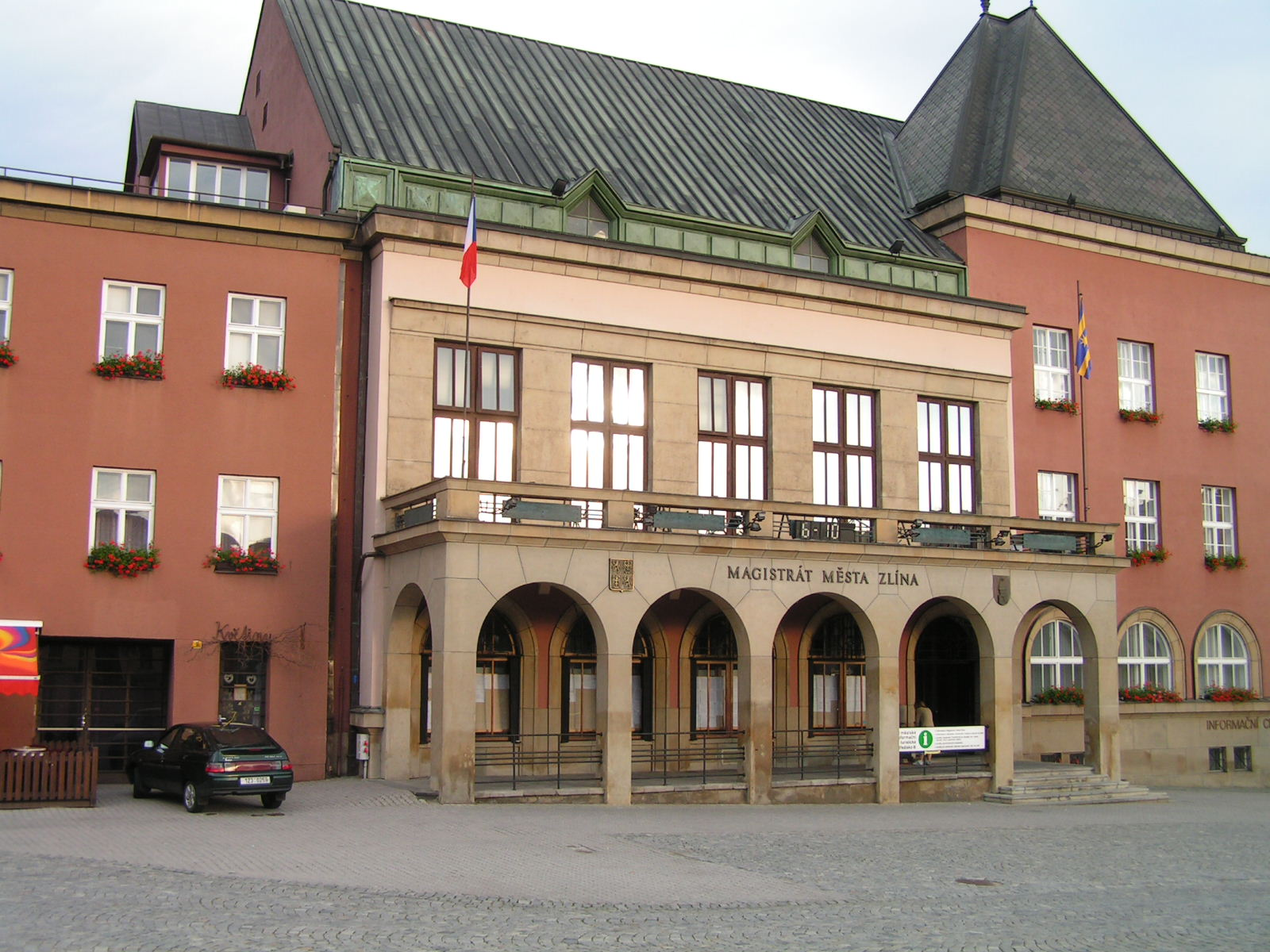
City Hall in Zlín from 1923 designed by Gahura

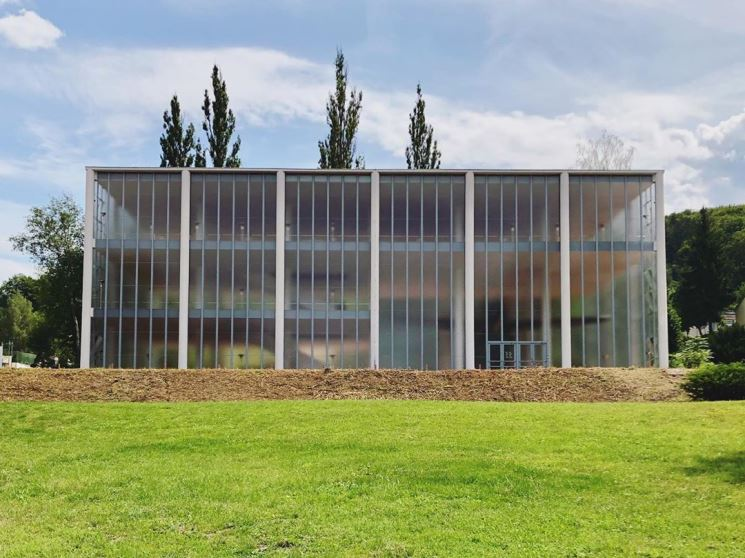
Tomas Bata Memorial (Zlín) from 1933

František Lydie Gahura (10 October 1891 – 15 September 1958) was a Czech architect and sculptor.

== Life and career ==
Gahura was born on 10 October 1891 in Zlín, Moravia, Austria-Hungary. He became famous for his collaboration on the architectural and urban design of the city of Zlín. He worked for the Bata Shoes organization in the 1920s and 1930s. Gahura was one of a number of Czech architects to design the "Bata houses" and Bata shoe factory at East Tilbury, Essex, England. The most impressive architectural work of František Lydie Gahura is Tomas Bata Memorial. The building process started in 1932 and the monument was open with ceremony on the day of the first anniversary of Tomáš Baťa death that is on 12 July 1933. It is the most valuable building of the Zlín functionalism.

Gahura died on 15 September 1958 in Brno.

== Works ==
- City Hall, Zlín (1923)
- Baťa Hospital, Zlín (1926–1930)
- Church of Saint Anthony of Padua, Míškovice (1922–1927)
- Chapel of Saint Wenceslaus, Kudlov (1927)
- J. A. Baťa Villa, Zlín (1927)
- Masaryk Schools, Zlín (1927–1928)
- Baťa Service House, Prague (1928–1929)
- Forest cemetery, Zlín (1931)
- Department store, Zlín (1931)
- Grand Cinema, Zlín (1931)
- Tomas Bata Memorial, Zlín (1933)

== Gallery ==
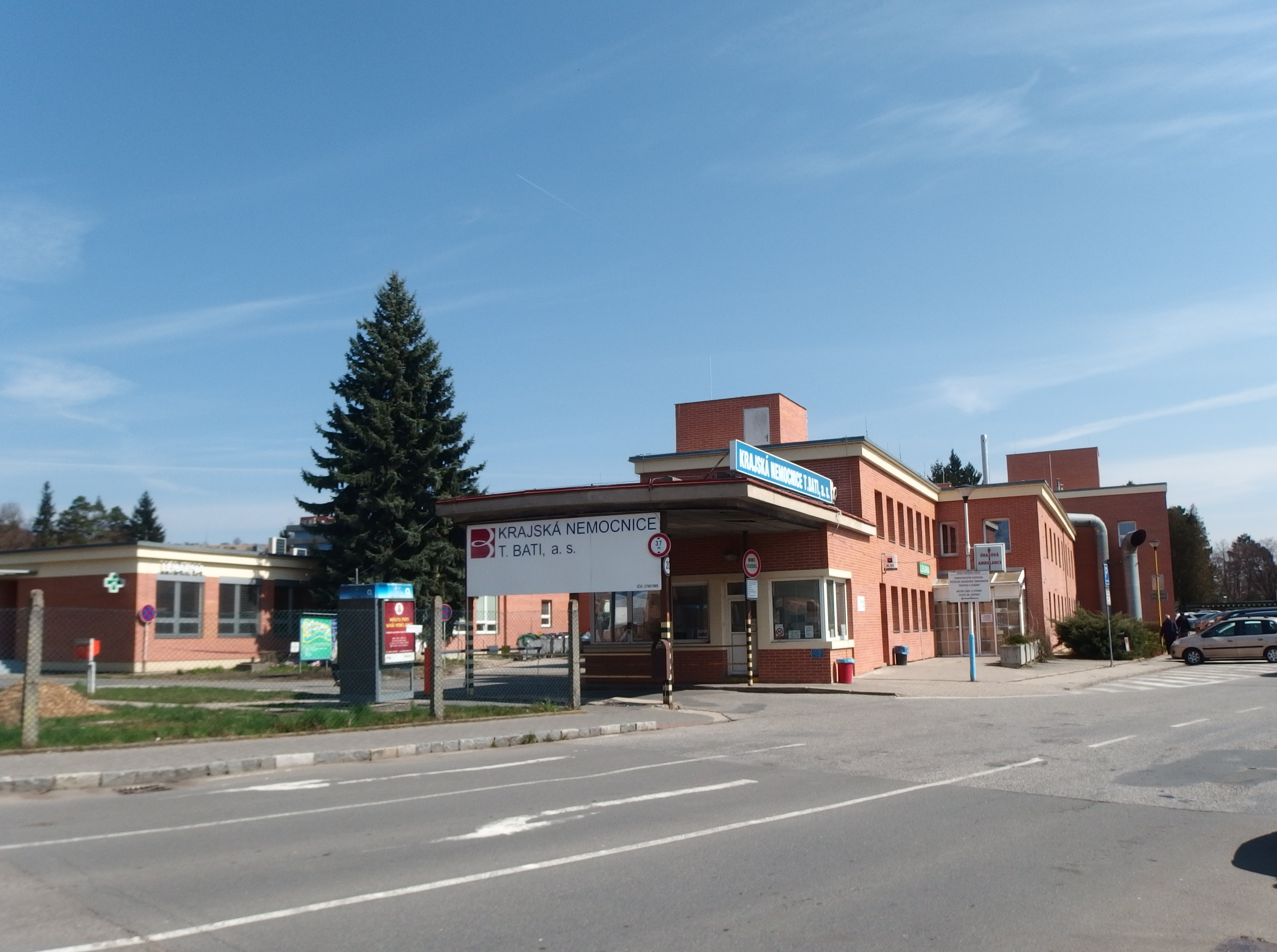
Baťa Hospital, Zlín

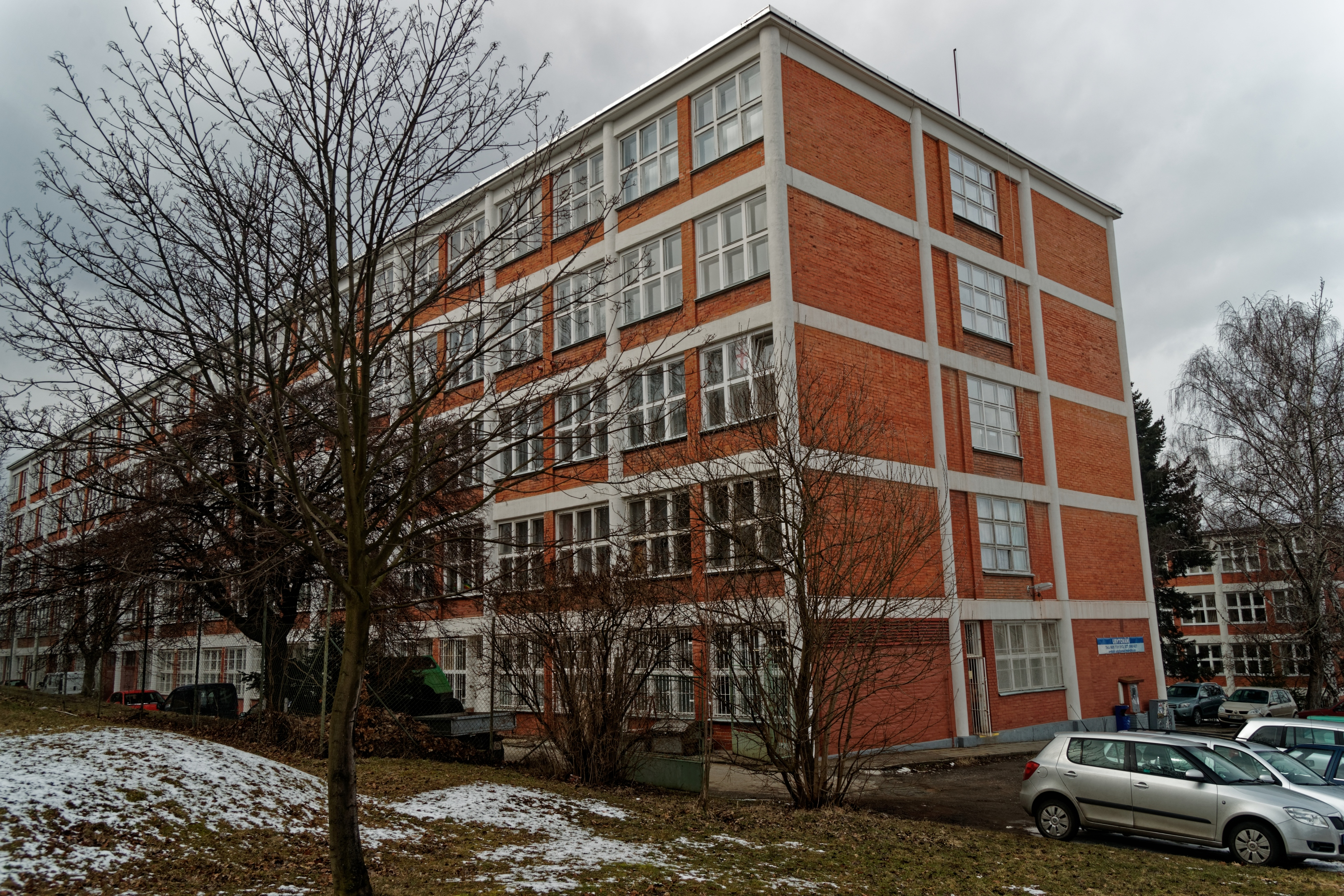

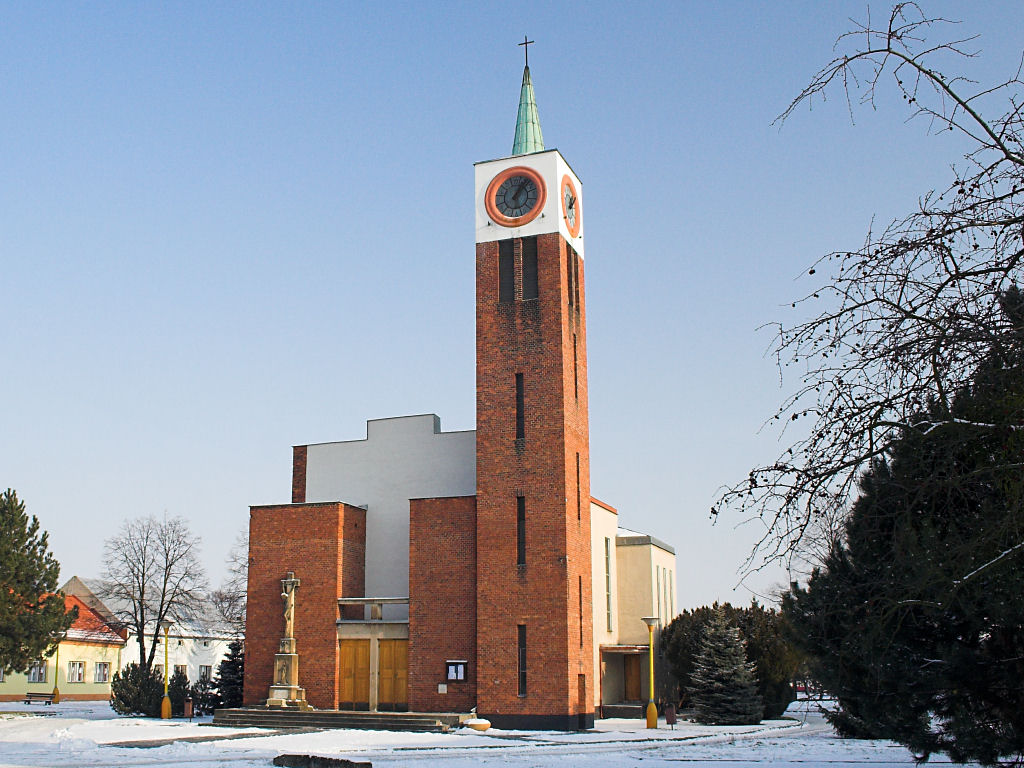
Church of Saint Anthony of Padua, Míškovice

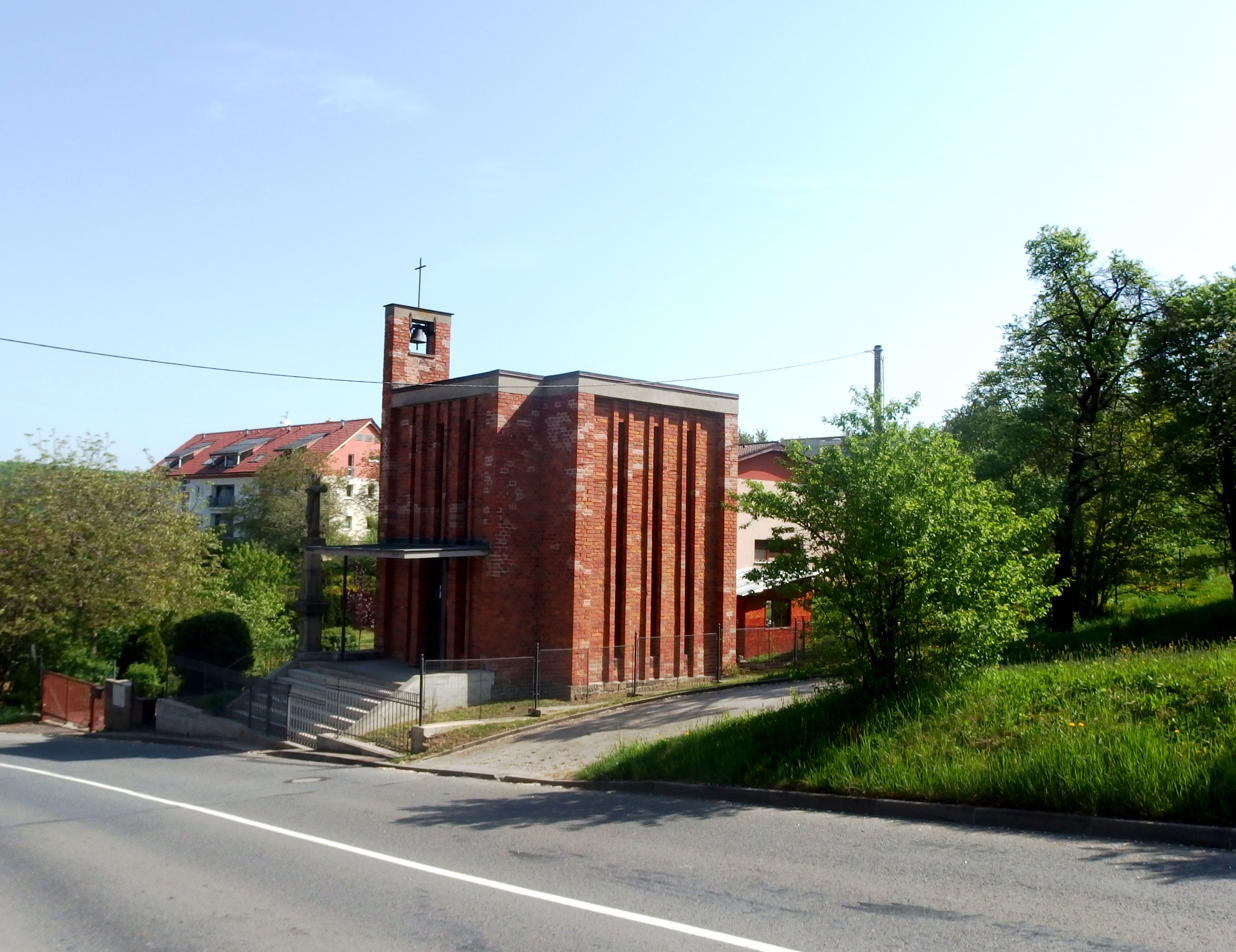
Chapel of Saint Wenceslaus, Kudlov

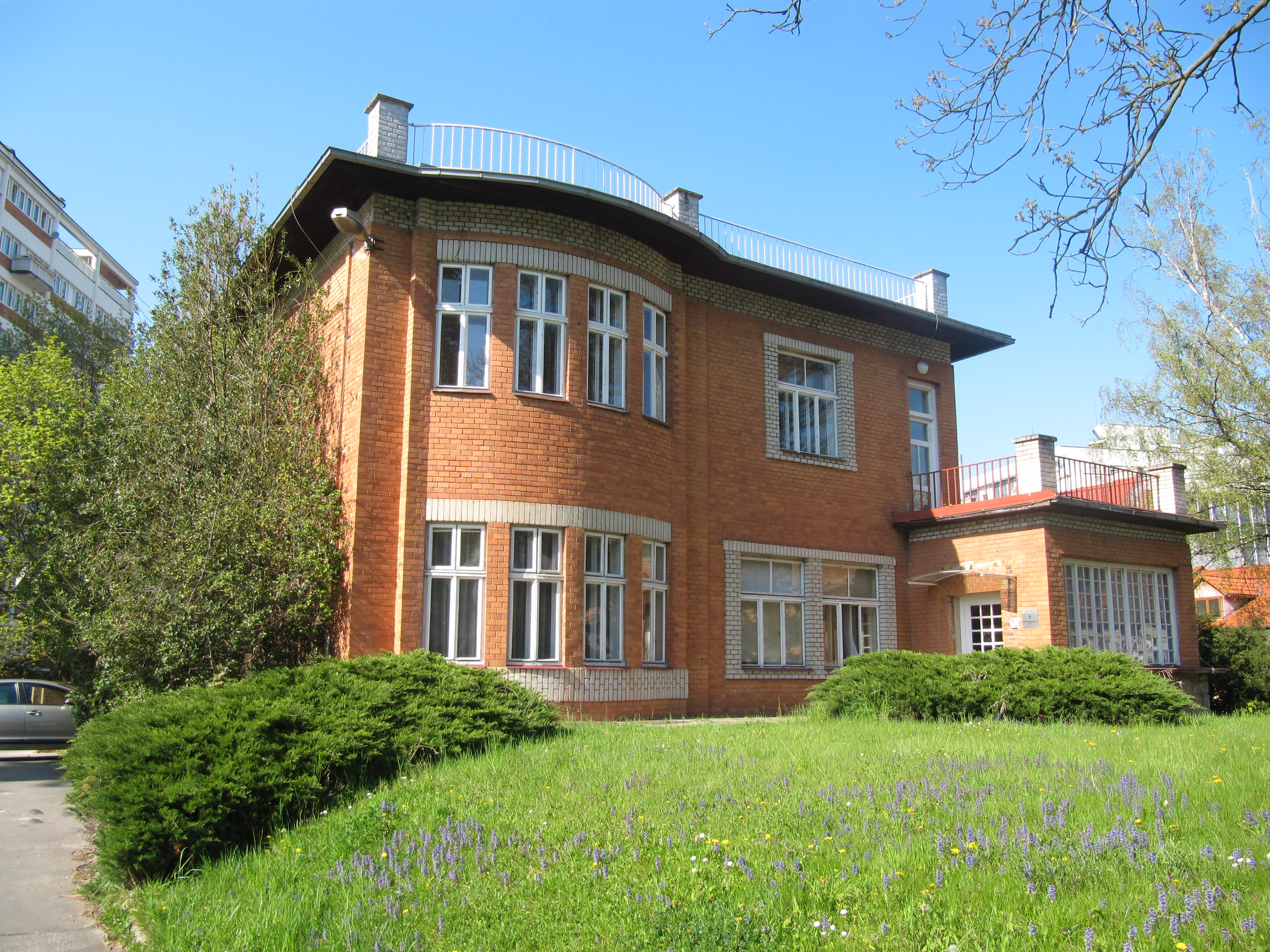
J. A. Baťa Villa, Zlín

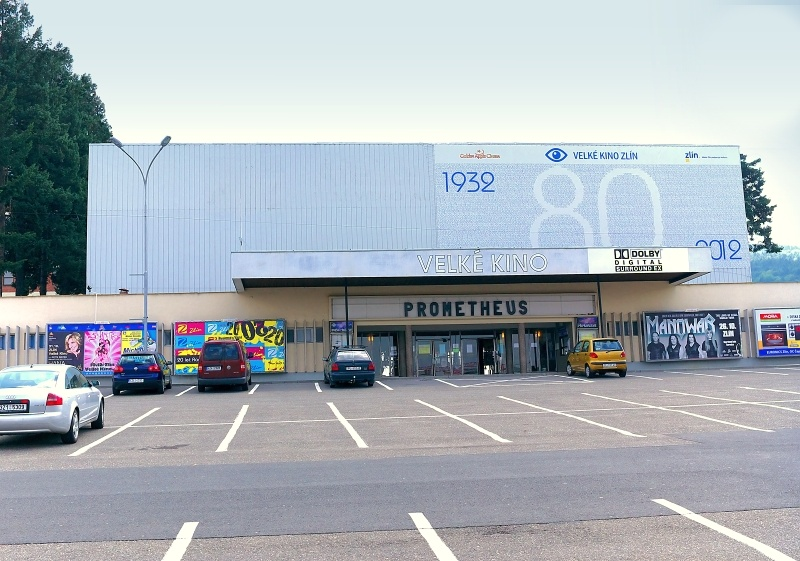
Grand Cinema, Zlín

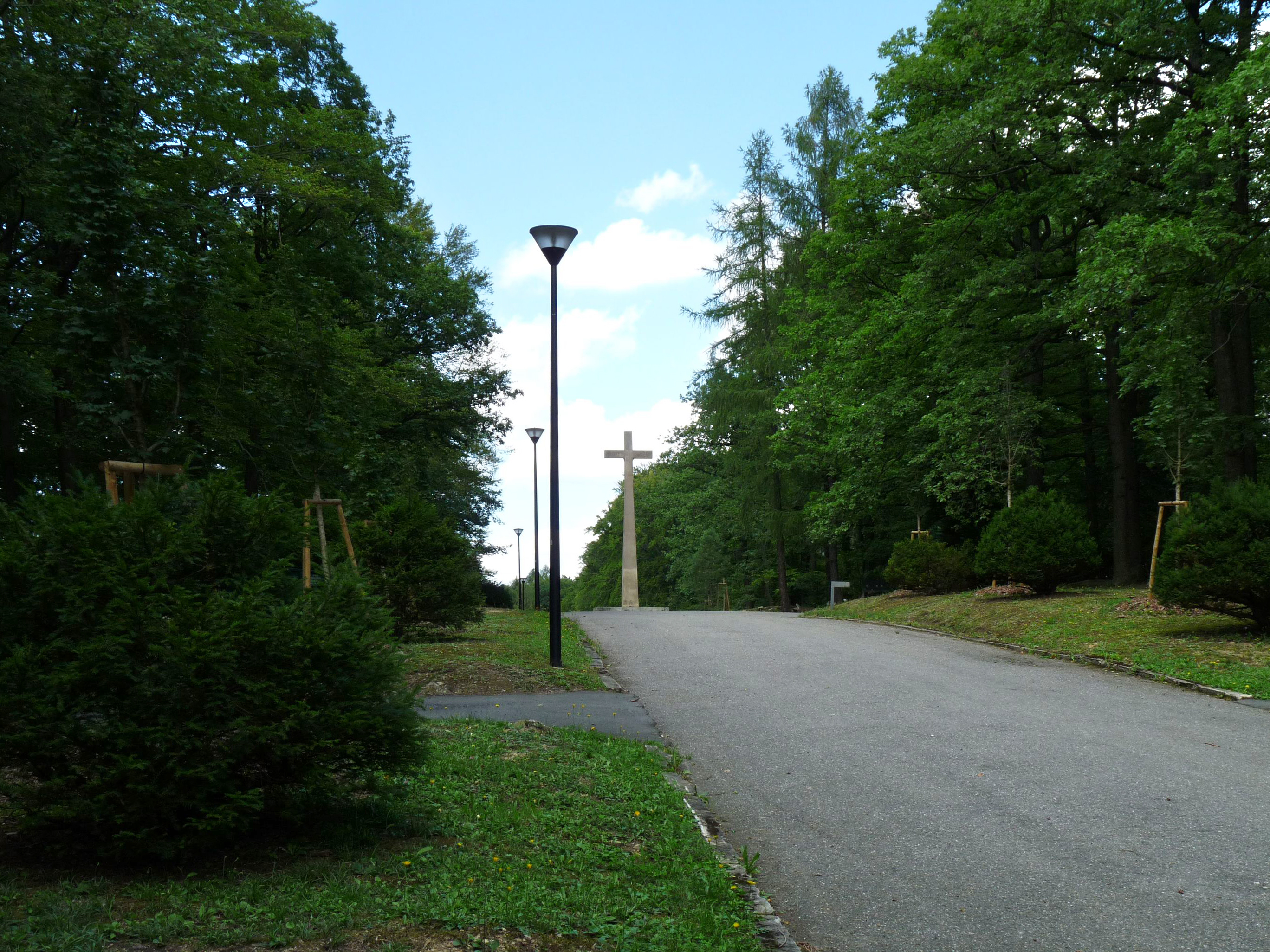
Forest cemetery, Zlín

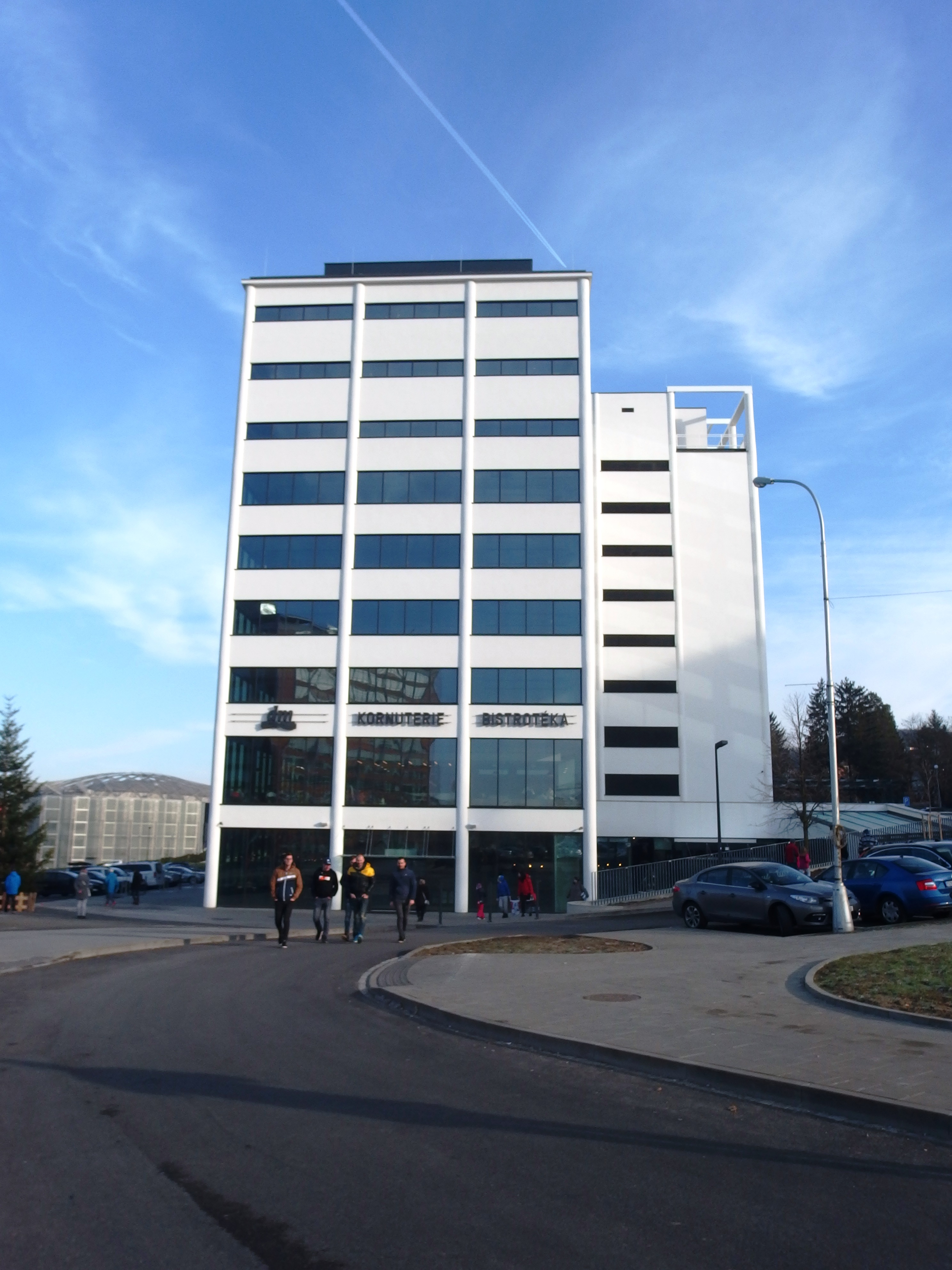
