= Hodslavice =

- Municipality
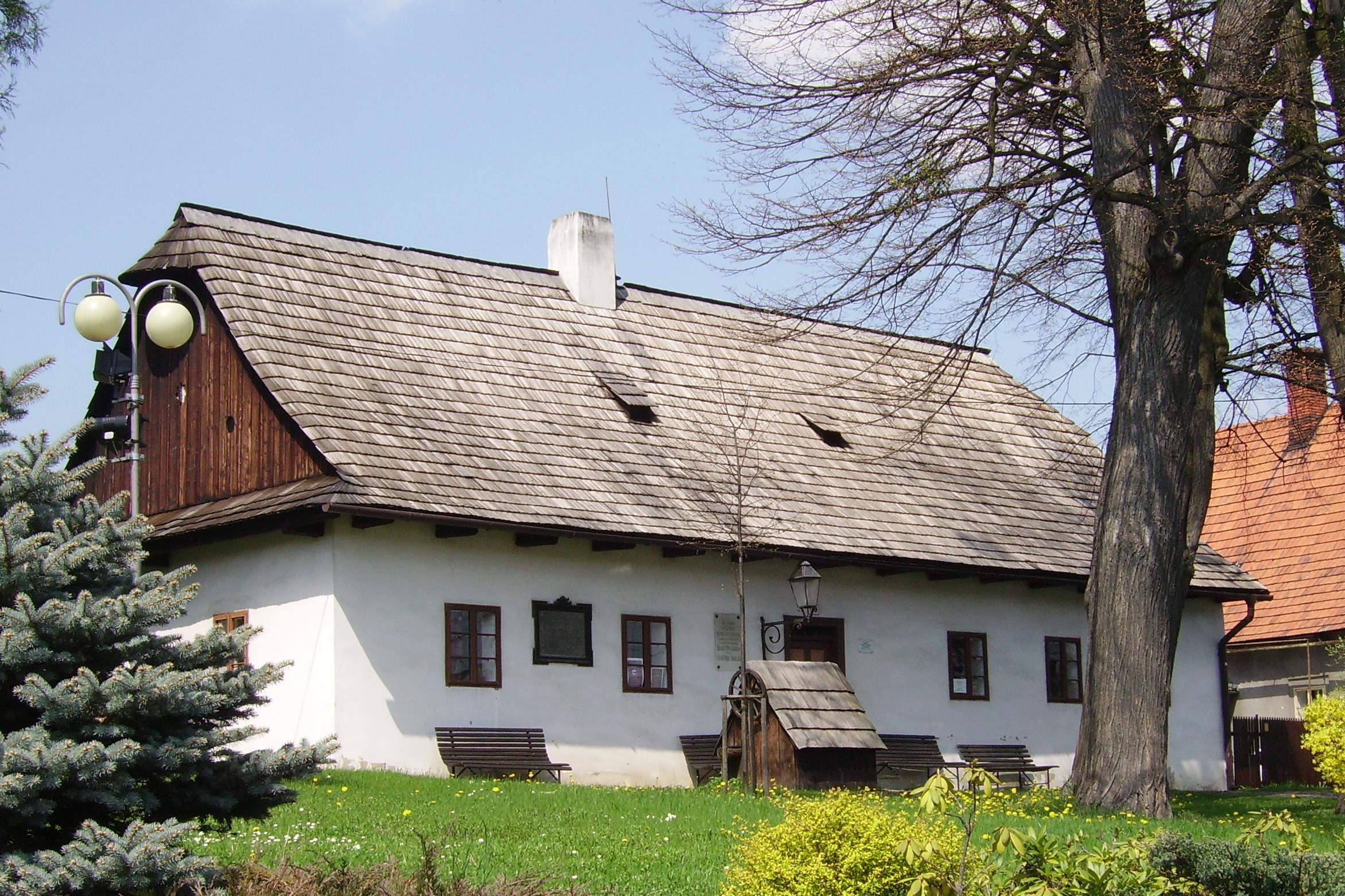
- Birthplace of František Palacký

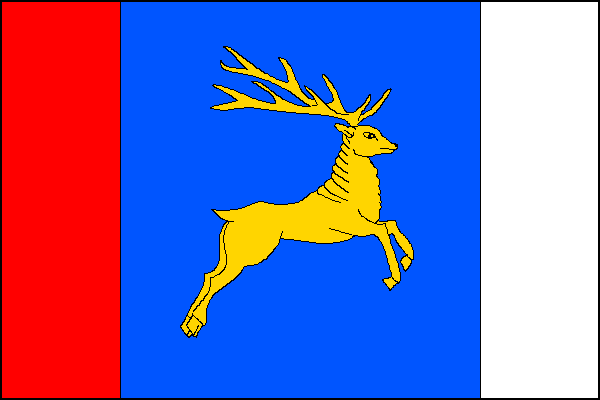
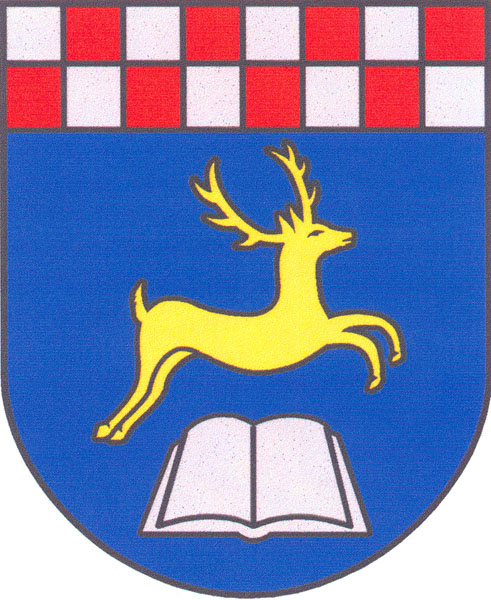
- Flag Coat of arms

- Location in the Czech Republic
- Coordinates: 49°32′19″N 18°1′25″E
- Country: Czech Republic
- Region: Moravian-Silesian
- District: Nový Jičín
- First mentioned: 1411

Area
  - Total: 10.85 km^{2} (4.19 sq mi)
- Elevation: 337 m (1,106 ft)

Population (2026-01-01)
  - Total: 1,692
  - Density: 155.9/km^{2} (403.9/sq mi)
- Time zone: UTC+1 (CET)
  - Summer (DST): UTC+2 (CEST)
- Postal code: 742 71
- Website: www.hodslavice.cz

Hodslavice (German: Hotzendorf) is a municipality and village in Nový Jičín District in the Moravian-Silesian Region of the Czech Republic. It has about 1,700 inhabitants.

== History ==
The first written mention of Hodslavice is from 1411.

== Demographics ==
Historical population
Year	Pop.	±%
1869	1,289	—
1880	1,386	+7.5%
1890	1,491	+7.6%
1900	1,682	+12.8%
1910	1,863	+10.8%
1921	1,739	−6.7%
1930	1,954	+12.4%
1950	1,628	−16.7%
1961	1,747	+7.3%
1970	1,709	−2.2%
1980	1,728	+1.1%
1991	1,666	−3.6%
2001	1,688	+1.3%
2011	1,656	−1.9%
2021	1,614	−2.5%
Source: Censuses

== Notable people ==
- František Palacký (1798–1876), historian and politician
- Josef Hromádka (1889–1969), theologian
- Svatopluk Turek (1900–1972), writer
