= Wheel bearing =

Wheel bearing may refer to:

- Ball bearing
- Bearing (mechanical)
- Fluid bearing
- Jewel bearing
- Journal bearing
- Needle roller bearing
- Plain bearing
- Rolling-element bearing
- Self-aligning ball bearing
- Spherical roller bearing
- Tapered roller bearing
- Thrust bearing
