= Cam follower =

Part of a cam mechanism which contacts the cam

A cam follower, also known as a track follower, is a specialized type of roller or needle bearing designed to follow cam lobe profiles. Cam followers come in a vast array of different configurations, however the most defining characteristic is how the cam follower mounts to its mating part; stud style cam followers use a stud while the yoke style has a hole through the middle.

== Construction ==
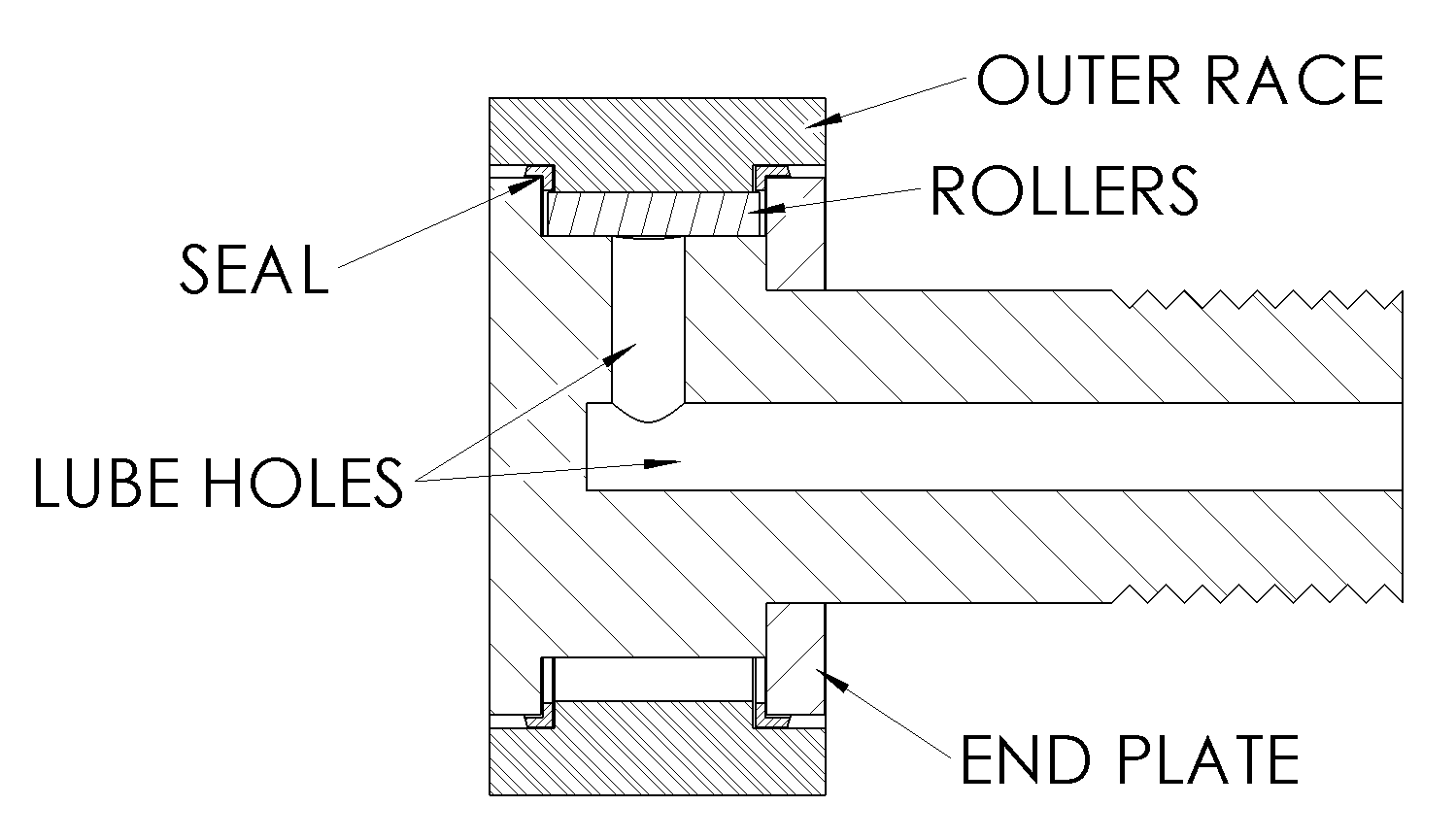
A cross-sectional view of a stud type cam follower

The modern stud type follower was invented and patented in 1937 by Thomas L. Robinson of the McGill Manufacturing Company. It replaced using a standard bearing and bolt. The new cam followers were easier to use because the stud was already included and they could also handle higher loads.

While roller cam followers are similar to roller bearings, there are quite a few differences. Standard ball and roller bearings are designed to be pressed into a rigid housing, which provides circumferential support. This keeps the outer race from deforming, so the race cross-section is relatively thin. In the case of cam followers the outer race is loaded at a single point, so the outer race needs a thicker cross-section to reduce deformation. However, in order to facilitate this the roller diameter must be decreased, which also decreases the dynamic bearing capacity.

End plates are used to contain the needles or bearing axially. On stud style followers one of the end plates is integrated into the inner race/stud; the other is pressed onto the stud up to a shoulder on the inner race. The inner race is induction hardened so that the stud remains soft if modifications need to be made. On yoke style followers the end plates are peened or pressed onto the inner race or liquid metal injected onto the inner race. The inner race is either induction hardened or through hardened.

Another difference is that a lubrication hole is provided to relubricate the follower periodically. A hole is provided at both ends of the stud for lubrication. They also usually have a black oxide finish to help reduce corrosion.

== Types ==
There are many different types of cam followers available.

=== Anti-friction element ===
The most common anti-friction element employed is a full complement of needle rollers. This design can withstand high radial loads but no thrust loads. A similar design is the caged needle roller design, which also uses needle rollers, but uses a cage to keep them separated. This design allows for higher speeds but decreases the load capacity. The cage also increases internal space so it can hold more lubrication, which increases the time between relubrications. Depending on the exact design sometimes two rollers are put in each pocket of the cage, using a cage design originated by RBC Bearings in 1971.

For heavy-duty applications a roller design can be used. This employs two rows of rollers of larger diameter than used in needle roller cam followers to increase the dynamic load capacity and provide some thrust capabilities. This design can support higher speeds than the full complement design.

For light-duty applications a bushing type follower can be used. Instead of using a type of a roller a plastic bushing is used to reduce friction, which provides a maintenance free follower. The disadvantage is that it can only support light loads, slow speeds, no thrust loads, and the temperature limit is 200 °F (93 °C). A bushing type stud follower can only support approximately 25% of the load of a roller type stud follower, while the heavy and yoke followers can handle 50%. Also all-metallic heavy-duty bushing type followers exist.

=== Shape ===
The outer diameter (OD) of the cam follower (stud or yoke) can be the standard cylindrical shape or be crowned. Crowned cam followers are used to keep the load evenly distributed if it deflects or if there is any misalignment between the follower and the followed surface. They are also used in turntable type applications to reduce skidding. Crowned followers can compensate for up to 0.5° of misalignment, while a cylindrical OD can only tolerate 0.06°. The only disadvantage is that they cannot bear as much load because of higher stresses.

=== Stud ===
Stud style cam followers usually have a standard sized stud, but a heavy stud is available for increased static load capacity.

==== Drives ====
The standard driving system for a stud type cam follower is a slot, for use with a flat head screwdriver. However, hex sockets are available for higher torquing ability, which is especially useful for eccentric cam followers and those used in blind holes. Hex socket cam followers from most manufacturers eliminate the relubrication capability on that end of the cam follower. RBC Bearings' Hexlube cam followers feature a relubrication fitting at the bottom of the hex socket.

==== Eccentricity ====
Stud type cam followers are available with an eccentric stud. The stud has a bushing pushed onto it that has an eccentric outer diameter. This allows for adjustability during installation to eliminate any backlash. The adjustable range for an eccentric bearing is twice that of the eccentricity.

=== Yoke ===
YOKE type cam followers are usually used in applications where minimal deflection is required, as they can be supported on both sides. They can support the same static load as a heavy stud follower.

== Track followers ==
All cam followers can be track followers, but not all track followers are cam followers. Some track followers have specially shaped outer diameters (OD) to follow tracks. For example, track followers are available with a V-groove for following a V-track, or the OD can have a flange to follow the lip of the track.

Specialized track followers are also designed to withstand thrust loads so the anti-friction elements are usually bearing balls or of a tapered roller bearing construction.

== See also ==
- Tappet
- Reciprocating motion
