= Lewis Heim =

American machinist and businessman

Lewis R. Heim
- Born: September 19, 1874; East Fishkill, New York
- Died: March 29, 1964 (age: 89); Orlando, Florida
- Occupations: Machinist, Inventor, Businessman
- Years active: 1896–1964
- Known for: Inventor of the Centerless Cylindrical Grinder and the Spherical Rod End Bearing.

Lewis Rasmus Heim (19 September 1874 – 29 March 1964) was an American machinist and businessman who was the inventor of the Centerless Cylindrical Grinder, the Heim Joint Rod End Bearing and a pioneer of modern spherical, ball and roller bearings.

Heim was a self-taught machinist with an ability to visualize complex mechanisms and mechanical processes that resulted in the creation of novel machines, machine tools, manufacturing methods and mechanical bearings and was granted 92 patents over his lifetime. His inventions ranged from machines to manufacture hats and automate the ironing of fold collars to precision grinders and industrial bearings used in automobiles, aircraft and machinery.

== Early life ==
Born on a farm in New York in 1874, Heim was the second of five children born to Charles and Frederika Heim, both immigrants from Germany. In 1890, at the age of 16, Heim moved to Danbury, Connecticut, which, at that time, was one of the major centers for manufacturing hats in the United States. Heim took several odd jobs before taking a job as a machinist at one of the Danbury hat-making companies.

== Inventions ==
Heim was an inventor of many types of machines, mechanical devices and manufacturing processes. In 1895, at the age of 21, Heim developed a hat-stiffening machine (Patent No. 573,876) that freed the operator from having to hold or manipulate the hat during the process of applying stiffening compound. Heim's invention saved time, improved quality and lowered the cost of stiffening hats. Heim subsequently developed six additional complementary hat-making machines that were bought by many local manufacturers. In 1901, a large multinational manufacturer of hat-making machinery purchased six of Heim's patents.

In 1902, Heim developed a laundry machine for detachable, fold-over collars. At that time, collars worn by men and women were stiffened with starch, then ironed to form an almost razor sharp edge that caused irritation to a person's neck. Heim's invention was a machine designed to iron, dry and shape detachable fold-over collars in a once-through process. Its unique feature, and one that was very popular, was its ability to soften the razor-edge of starched and ironed collars.3 Heim received his first patent (780,750) for the “Collar Roller” in January 1903 and thereafter received seven additional patents for improvements and other types of collar and cuff ironing machines that he sold throughout North America, Europe and Asia.

=== Centerless Cylindrical Grinder ===
In 1910, Heim entered the nascent business of precision-made rolling type bearings and formed the Ball and Roller Bearing Company in Danbury, Connecticut. Heim first manufactured ball thrust, roller thrust and journal roller bearings mostly for machinery and vehicles. At that time, grinding processes used to manufacture the cylindrical rolls used in roller bearings were slow, tedious and costly. Most rolls were ground on center-type machines resembling lathes. The lack of suitable grinding machines for mass-production of bearing rolls, that were made from hardened steel, led Heim to develop a method for grinding rolls without centers.

In late 1913, Heim conceived of a two-wheel grinding machine that used a slowly rotating regulating wheel for controlling roll rotation against a high-speed grinding wheel. Heim filed his first patent (1,210,937) for a two-wheel centerless cylindrical grinder using a regulating wheel in March 1915. Heim called his invention a double-ring wheel roll grinding machine that ground uniform cylindrical work (rolls) using the radial sides of the two wheels. In order to grind a succession of rolls and to induce automatic forward motion of the rolls through the grinding zone, Heim installed an inclined centerless carrier in between the two wheels. The machine was able to grind 100 rolls for every roll ground on center-type grinders, grind to precision dimensions and greatly reduce production costs.

Following the double ring-wheel machine, Heim developed centerless grinders using the peripheral surfaces of the two wheels that became the standard configuration for all future centerless grinders. His machines used either inclined carriers (1,264,930) or forward tilted regulating wheels (1,579,933) to draw the work through the grinding zone. The machines were able to grind both uniform and non-uniform cylindrical work with later machines able to achieve extreme precision to within 0.00001 inch (0.25 microns) and perfectly round work. Heim also developed tools and methods for grinding cylindrical work with various profiles including tapered, headed, rings, concave and convex shapes and was granted a total of 28 patents for centerless grinding.

Heim's invention of the two-wheel centerless grinder had an immediate and widespread impact on industry, especially the automobile industry that ground many small cylindrical parts for internal combustion engines and other components. Heim's centerless grinder was so novel at the time that many machine tool companies illegally copied and sold competing machines. Heim's machine played an important roll in the development of automatic machine tools that was recognized by the Smithsonian Institution in its exhibit on grinding during the Hall of Tools exhibition presented in 1964.

=== Spherical Rod End Bearing ===
Heim was the original inventor of the Spherical Rod End Bearing that became known as the “Heim Joint” and “Heim Rod End”. In 1942, at the request of the US Army Air Force, Heim developed a four-piece spherical bearing for installation in the control system of fighter aircraft to improve maneuverability. Heim's bearing consisted of a ball with a drilled-through hole, a threaded shaft (rod) that contained a circular head forming the outer race, and two soft-metal bushings that sealed the ball into the head. The threaded shaft allowed the rod end of the bearing to be connected to a moving component and adjusted as necessary for a tight connection. On September 29, 1942, Heim filed his first patent application for the four-piece rod end bearing that was granted patent number 2,366,668 on January 2, 1945.

In the fall of 1942, after testing against competing designs, the US Army Air Force awarded the Heim Company of Fairfield, Connecticut, the sole contract to produce spherical rod end bearings. Shortly thereafter, in order to help the war effort, Heim licensed the Rose Bearings Company of Saxilby, UK to manufacture rod end bearings for British aircraft. With its ability to handle misalignment and relatively heavy loads in linkages transmitting motion or power, Heim's rod end bearing was installed in most US and Allied aircraft by the end of World War II.

Subsequently, Heim developed improvements to his rod end bearing as well as machines and methods used in its manufacture. Following the development of the rod end bearing, Heim developed spherical plain bearings that omitted the long rod that was used in textile looms, levers and general machinery. Later, starting around 1953, Heim developed designs, machines and methods for manufacturing two-piece spherical bearings (plain and rod end types) using various swaging methods such as those disclosed in patent 2,787,048.

Similar methods were also used to manufacture ball and roller bearings with unbroken races that eliminated the need for slots or notches used to insert the rolling elements. Slots and notches created breaks in the smooth race surfaces that accelerated wear that reduced the life of the bearing. Heim developed machines and methods, such as those in patents 2,910,765 & 2,913,810, for expanding or contracting metal components that allowed for the manufacture of bearings with perfectly smooth races. These bearings contained a full complement of balls or rollers that made the bearing suitable for higher load ratings as well as extending its operating life. Many of Heim's machines and methods developed in the 1950s and 1960s continue to be employed in the manufacture of modern rolling bearings.
