= Spherical roller thrust bearing =

Type of roller bearing which supports axial loads and permits angular misalignment

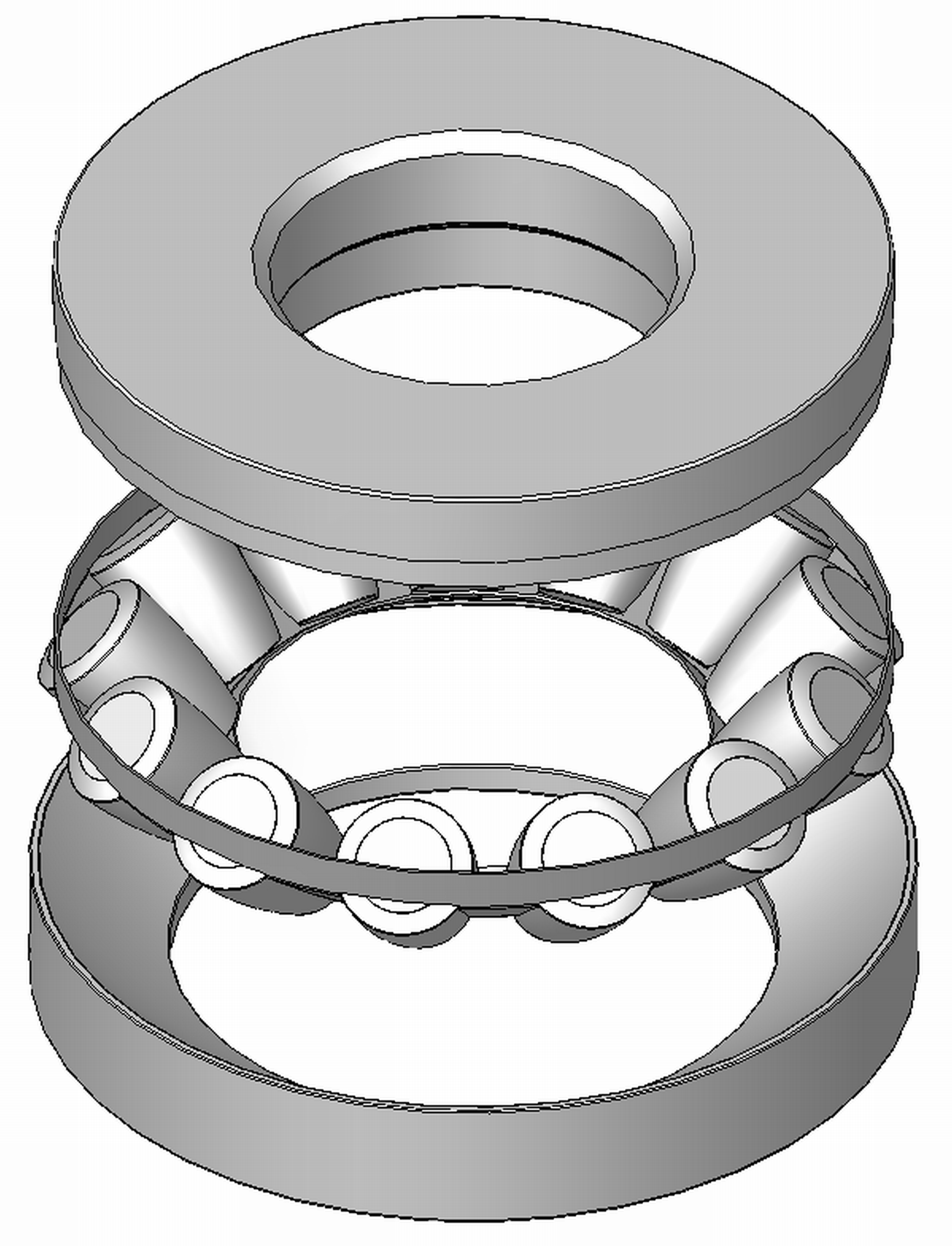
A spherical roller thrust bearing

A spherical roller thrust bearing is a rolling-element bearing of thrust type that permits rotation with low friction, and permits angular misalignment. The bearing is designed to take radial loads, and heavy axial loads in one direction. Typically these bearings support a rotating shaft in the bore of the shaft washer that may be misaligned in respect to the housing washer. The misalignment is possible due to the spherical internal shape of the house washer.

== Construction ==
Spherical roller thrust bearings consist of a shaft washer (for radial bearings often called "inner ring"), a housing washer (for radial bearings often called "outer ring"), asymmetrical rollers and a cage. There are also bearing units available that can take axial loads in two directions.

== History ==
The spherical roller thrust bearing was introduced by SKF in 1939. The design of the early bearings is similar to the design that is still in use in modern machines.

== Designs ==
Section view of a spherical roller thrust bearing

The internal design of the bearing is not standardised by ISO, so it varies between different manufacturers and different series. Some of the design parameters are:

- Roller shape and dimensions
- Flange design
- Non-rotational notches in house washer

The spherical roller thrust bearings have the highest load rating density of all thrust bearings.

== Dimensions ==
External dimensions of spherical roller bearings are standardised by ISO in the standard ISO 104:2015. Some common series of spherical roller bearings are:

- 292
- 293
- 294

== Materials ==
Bearing rings and rolling elements can be made of a number of different materials, but the most common is "chrome steel", a material with approximately 1.5% chrome content. Such "chrome steel" has been standardized by a number of authorities, and there are therefore a number of similar materials, such as: AISI 52100 (USA), 100CR6 (Germany), SUJ2 (Japan) and GCR15 (China).

Some common materials for bearing cages:

- Sheet steel (stamped or laser-cut)
- Brass (stamped or machined)
- Steel (machined)

The choice of material is mainly done by the manufacturing volume and method. For large-volume bearings, cages are often of stamped sheet-metal, whereas low volume series often have cages of machined brass or machined steel.

== Manufacturers ==
Some manufacturers of spherical roller bearings are SKF, Schaeffler, Timken Company and NSK Ltd.

== Applications ==
Spherical roller thrust bearings are used in industrial applications, where there are heavy axial loads, moderate speeds and possibly misalignment. Some common application areas are:

- Gearboxes
- Pulp and paper processing equipment (notably refiners)
- Marine propulsion and offshore drilling
- Cranes and swing bridges
- Water turbines
- Extruders for injection molding

== See also ==
- Bearing (mechanical)
- Rolling-element bearing
- Self-aligning ball bearing
- Spherical plain bearing
- Spherical roller bearing
- Tapered roller bearing
- Thrust bearing
