= Arvid Palmgren =

Nils Arvid Palmgren
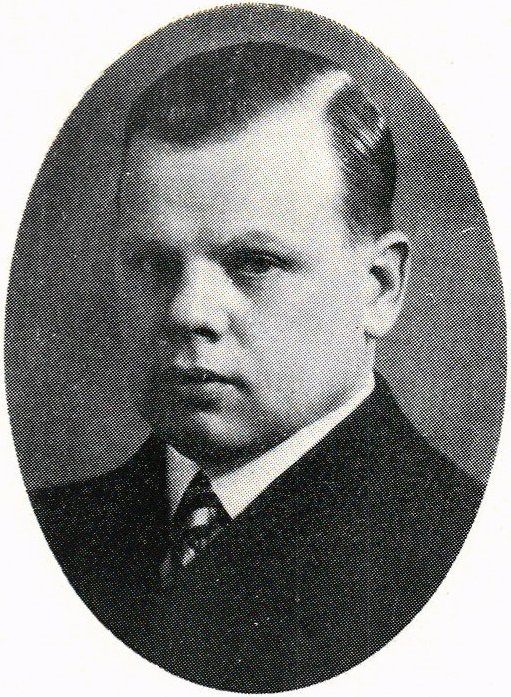
- 1935 photograph of Arvid Palmgren
- Born: April 30, 1890; Falun, Sweden
- Died: November 14, 1971 (aged 81); Lerum, Sweden
- Education: Royal Institute of Technology (KTH)
- Occupations: Engineer, Inventor
- Employer: SKF
- Known for: Inventor of the spherical roller bearing

Nils Arvid Palmgren (30 April 1890 – 14 November 1971) was a Swedish engineer and inventor, best known for creating the Spherical roller bearing. His work at SKF and his contributions to bearing life theory remain fundamental in mechanical engineering and tribology.

== Early life and education ==
Palmgren was born in Falun, Sweden. He completed secondary education in Stockholm in 1909 and passed his reserve officer's exam in 1911. In 1916 he graduated as a civil engineer in road and water construction from the KTH Royal Institute of Technology. He later received a Doctor of Technology degree from KTH in 1930.

== Career ==
Palmgren began his career at the Swedish Road and Water Construction Authority in 1916. In 1917 he joined SKF as a research engineer. In 1919 he patented the self-aligning spherical roller bearing in 19 countries, with Swedish patent no. 53,856. This invention revolutionized mechanical design by allowing bearings to accommodate misalignment and heavy loads.

== Contributions ==
- Spherical roller bearing (1919): Palmgren's invention became a cornerstone of modern machinery, widely adopted across industries.
- Bearing life theory: In collaboration with Gustaf Lundberg, Palmgren developed the Lundberg–Palmgren theory in 1947, introducing probabilistic methods for predicting bearing life.
- Fatigue hypothesis (1924): Published an influential hypothesis on fatigue damage in structures, widely used in mechanical design.

== Legacy ==
Palmgren's work laid the foundation for modern bearing design and reliability analysis. His theories continue to influence international standards for rolling element bearings. The centenary of his spherical roller bearing invention was celebrated in 2019.
