= Ball and Roller Bearing Company =

- U.S. National Register of Historic Places
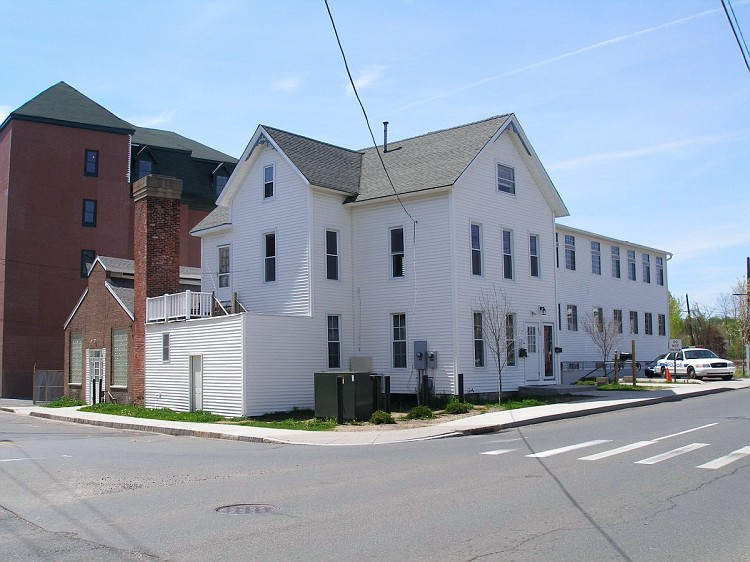

- Location within Connecticut Location within the United States
- Location: 20-22 Maple Avenue, Danbury, Connecticut
- Coordinates: 41°23′54″N 73°27′8″W
- Area: 0.3 acres (0.12 ha)
- Built: 1886
- Architectural style: Queen Anne
- NRHP reference No.: 89001087
- Added to NRHP: August 25, 1989

The Ball and Roller Bearing Company, also known as American Family Crafts and the Joseph Nutt House and Machine Shop, is a historic industrial complex at 20-22 Maple Avenue in Danbury, Connecticut. Developed mainly in the early 20th century, the factory is most notable as the location where Lewis Heim invented the modern grinding machine, which revolutionized the manufacture of machine parts. The complex was listed on the National Register of Historic Places on August 25, 1989. It now houses a church and social service agencies.

== Description and history ==
The former Ball and Roller Bearing Company plant is located in a mainly industrial area east of downtown Danbury, on the west side of Maple Street just south of its crossing of railroad tracks. The complex includes three buildings, two of which are wood frame, and one of which is brick. The two wood-frame buildings include the Queen Anne-style former home of Joseph Nutt, who established a machine shop providing services to Danbury's hat making industry in 1886. Nutt's home also served as his company's office, and is attached to a single-story monitor-roofed brick structure. Connected to these is the main three-story wood-frame factory building. The latter building used to have a series of additions extending further north; these were heavily damaged by fire in 1987, and demolished.

The Nutt factory was purchased by Lewis and Alfred Heim in 1904. Lewis Heim had worked in Danbury's hat factories, and had by that time already patented several inventions, including improvements to hatmaking machinery. The Heim brothers branched out into the manufacture of ball and roller bearings in 1909, parts which were in high demand for the burgeoning automotive industry. Their success resulted in the repeated expansion of the factory, and it was here that Lewis Heim developed and improved the centerless grinding machine, which enabled the precision shaping of cylindrical parts. Heim sold most of his patent rights in 1922 and the plant in 1928. His Ball and Roller Bearing Company continues to operate in New Milford, Connecticut. The buildings have since been repurposed to other non-industrial uses, with some loss of historic integrity.

== See also ==
- National Register of Historic Places listings in Fairfield County, Connecticut
