= Needle roller bearing =

Type of roller bearing which uses long, thin cylinders as rollers

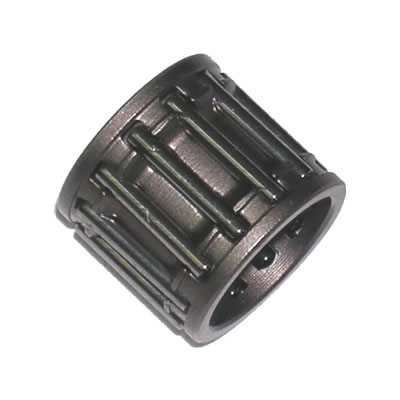
A needle roller bearing

A needle roller bearing is a special type of roller bearing which uses long, thin cylindrical rollers resembling needles. Ordinary roller bearings' rollers are only slightly longer than their diameter, but needle bearings typically have rollers that are at least four times longer than their diameter. Like all bearings, they are used to reduce the friction of a rotating surface.

Compared to ball bearings and ordinary roller bearings, needle bearings have a greater surface area in contact with the races, so they can support a greater load. They are also thinner, so they require less clearance between the axle and the surrounding structure.

Needle bearings are heavily used in automobile components such as hydraulic tappets, rocker arm pivots, pumps, compressors, and transmissions. The drive shaft of a rear-wheel drive vehicle typically has at least eight needle bearings (four in each U joint) and often more if it is particularly long, or operates on steep slopes.

== See also ==
- Race (bearing)
- Tapered roller bearing
