= Thrust bearing =

Family of rotary bearings designed to support axial loads

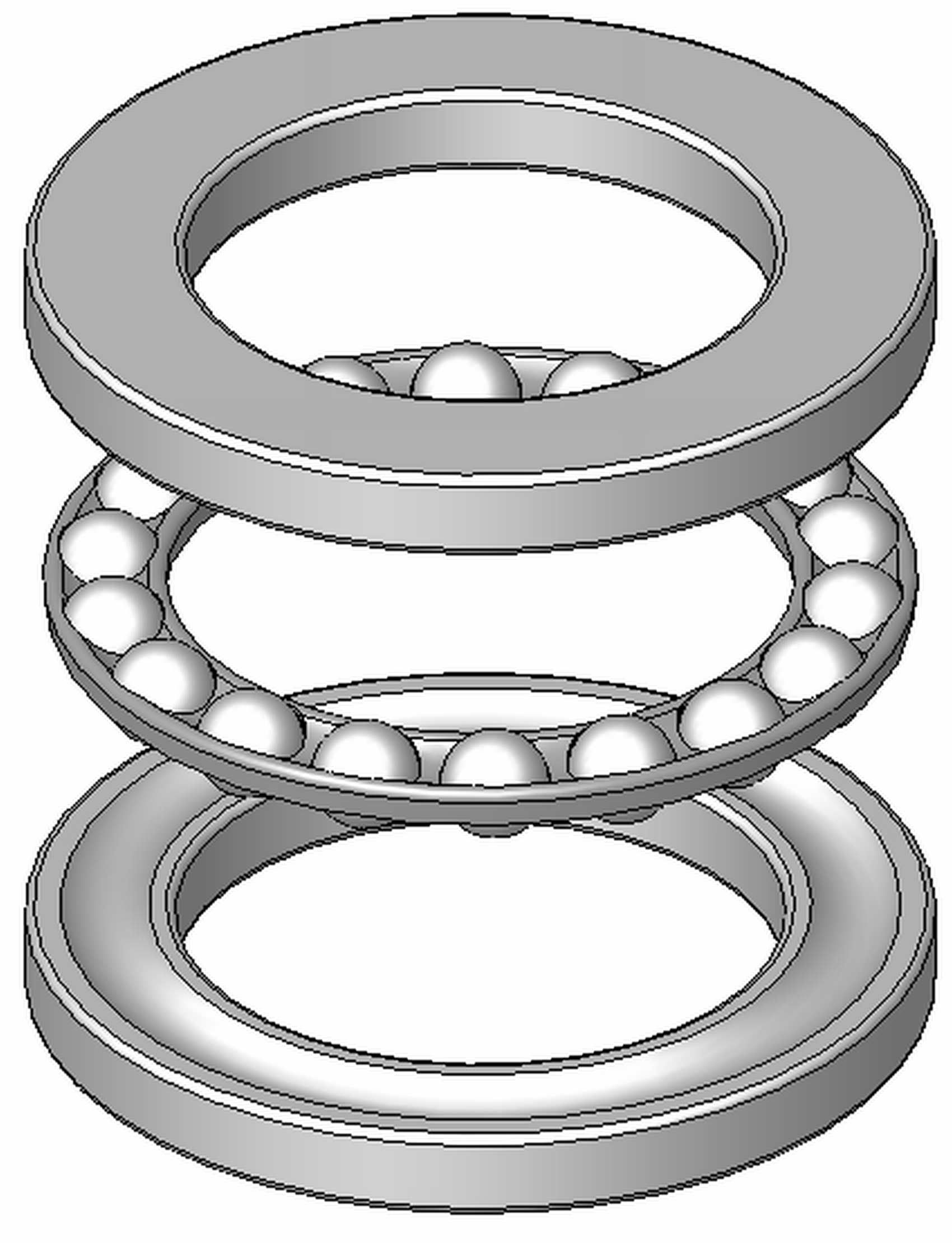
A thrust ball bearing

A thrust bearing is a particular type of rotary bearing. Like other bearings they permanently rotate between parts, but they are designed to support a predominantly axial load.

Thrust bearings come in several varieties.

- Thrust ball bearings, composed of bearing balls supported in a ring, can be used in low-thrust applications where there is little axial load.
- Cylindrical roller thrust bearings consist of small cylindrical rollers arranged flat with their axes pointing to the axis of the bearing. They give very good carrying capacity and are cheap, but tend to wear due to the differences in radial speed and friction, which is higher than with ball bearings.
- Tapered roller thrust bearings consist of small tapered rollers arranged so that their axes all converge at a point on the axis of the bearing. The length of the roller and the diameter of the wide and the narrow ends, and the angle of the rollers need to be carefully calculated to provide the correct taper so that each end of the roller rolls smoothly on the bearing face without skidding. These are the type most commonly used in automotive applications (to support the wheels of a motor car for example), where they are used in pairs to accommodate axial thrust in either direction, as well as radial loads. They can support greater thrust loads than the ball type due to the larger contact area, but are more expensive to manufacture.

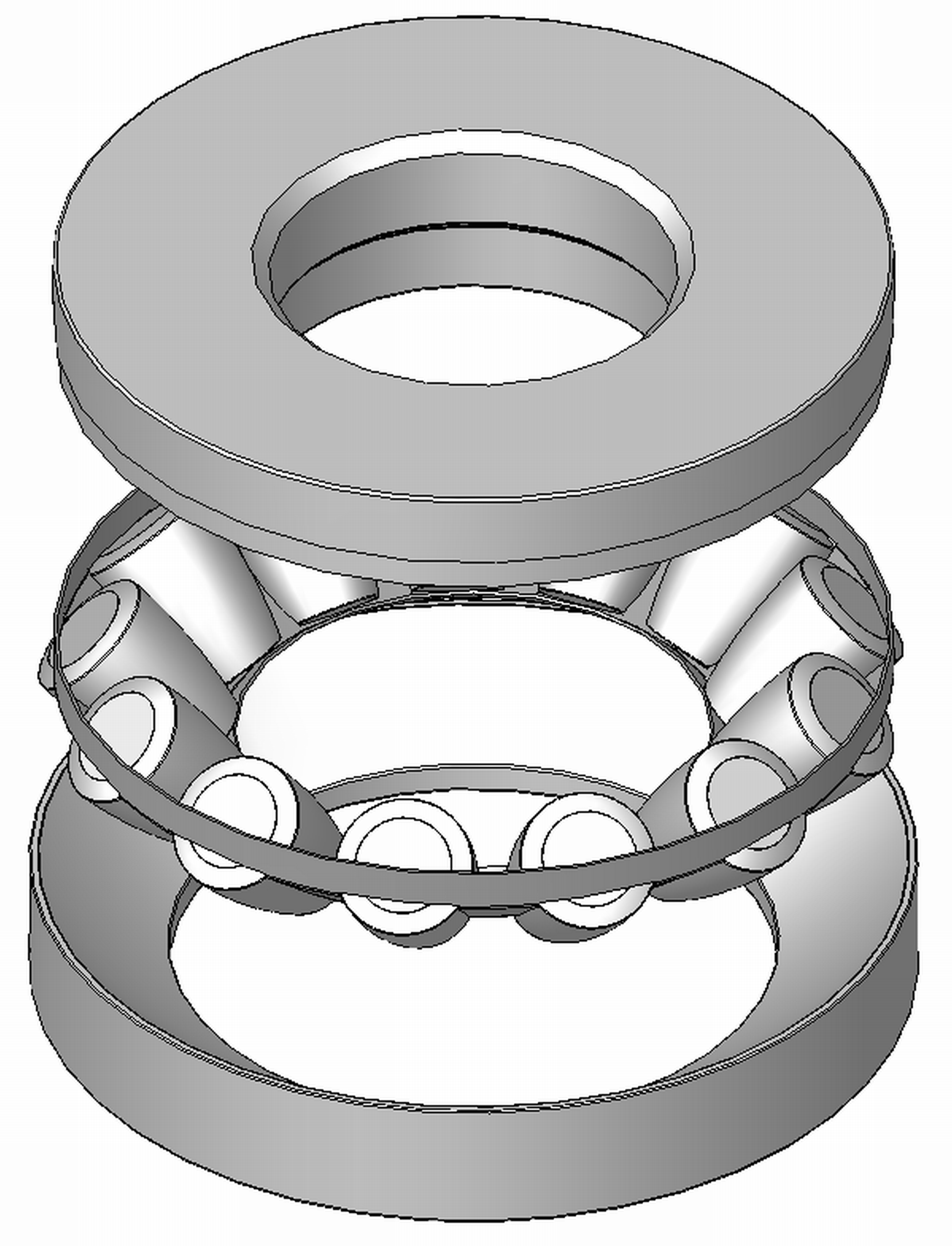
A spherical roller thrust bearing

- Spherical roller thrust bearings use asymmetrical rollers of spherical shape, rolling inside a house washer with a raceway with spherical inner shape. They can accommodate combined radial and axial loads and also accommodate misalignment of the shafts. They are often used together with radial spherical roller bearings. Spherical roller thrust bearings offer the highest load rating density of all thrust bearings.
- Fluid bearings, where the axial thrust is supported on a thin layer of pressurized liquid—these give low drag.

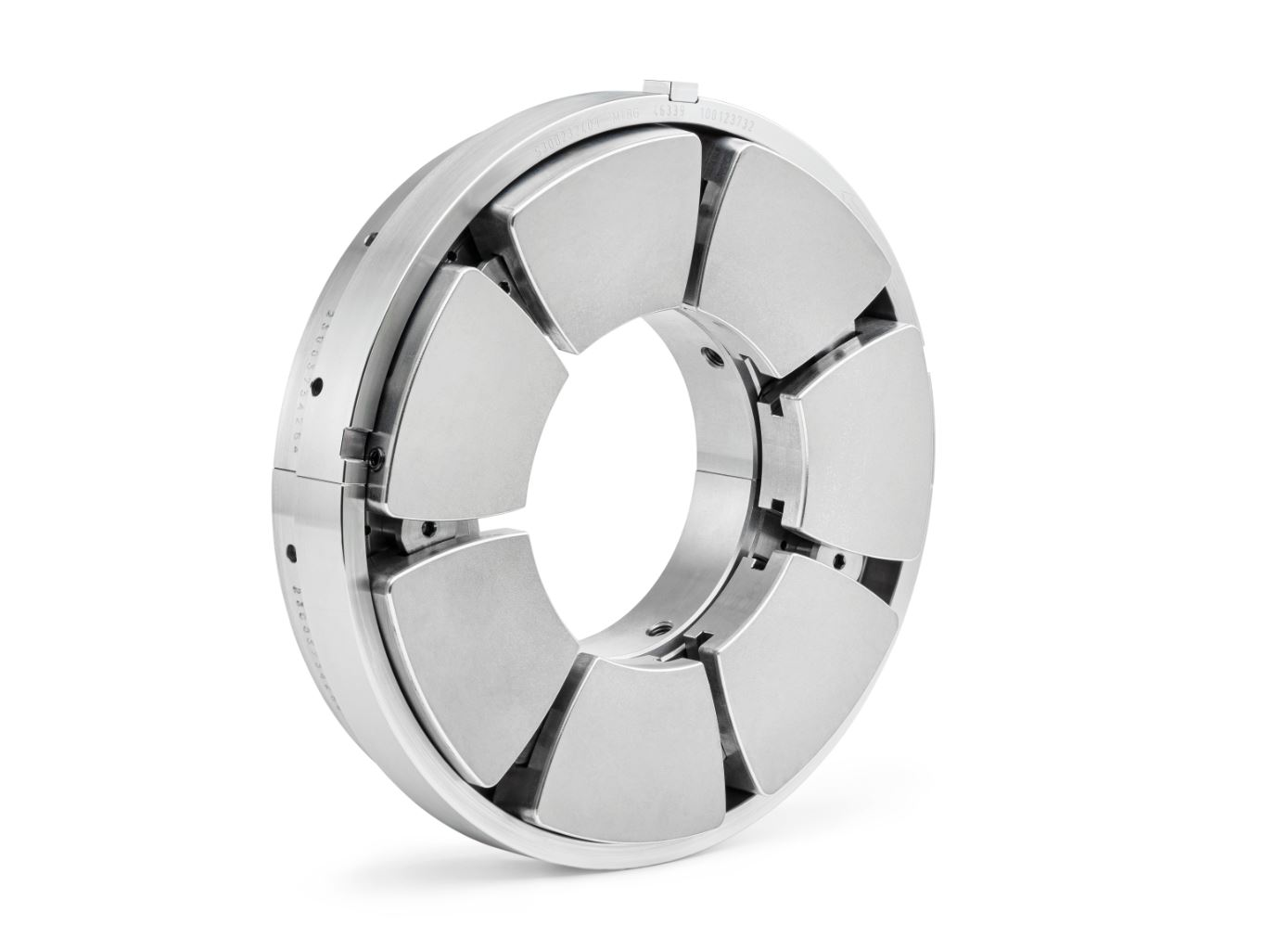
Miba fluid film thrust bearing

- Magnetic bearings, where the axial thrust is supported on a magnetic field. This is used where very high speeds or very low drag are needed, for example the Zippe-type centrifuge.

Thrust bearings are commonly used in automotive, marine, and aerospace applications. They are also used in the main and tail rotor blade grips of RC (radio-controlled) helicopters.

Thrust bearings are used in cars because the forward gears in modern car gearboxes use helical gears which, while aiding in smoothness and noise reduction, cause axial forces that need to be dealt with.

Thrust bearings are also used with radio antenna masts to reduce the load on an antenna rotator.

One kind of thrust bearing in an automobile is the clutch "throw out" bearing, sometimes called the clutch release bearing.

== Fluid film thrust bearings ==
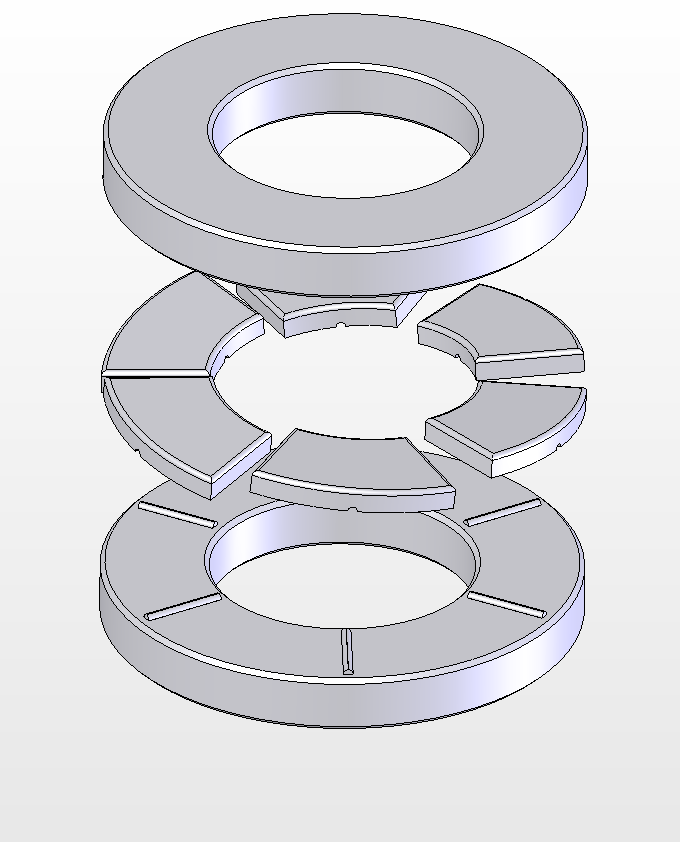
Exploded view of a Michell type thrust bearing. Each sector-shaped pad can pivot on the ridges on the lower plate.

Fluid-film thrust bearings were invented by Albert Kingsbury, who discovered the principle in the course of bearing and lubrication investigations commencing in 1888 while a student. His first experimental bearing was tested in 1904. He filed for a patent in 1907, and it was granted in 1910. The first Kingsbury bearing in hydroelectric service, one of its major applications, was installed at the Holtwood Generating Station in 1912. It remains in full use today.

Thrust bearings were independently invented by Australian engineer George Michell, who patented his invention in 1905.

Fluid thrust bearings contain a number of sector-shaped pads, arranged in a circle around the shaft, and which are free to pivot. These create wedge-shaped regions of oil inside the bearing between the pads and a rotating disk, which support the applied thrust and eliminate metal-on-metal contact.

Kingsbury and Michell's invention was notably applied to the thrust block in ships. The small size (one-tenth the size of old bearing designs), low friction, and long life of Kingsbury and Michell's invention made possible the development of more powerful engines and propellers. They were used extensively in ships built during World War I, and have become the standard bearing used on turbine shafts in ships and power plants worldwide. (See also Michell/Kingsbury tilting-pad fluid bearings)

Today, thrust bearings continue to play an essential role in rotating equipment like expanders, pumps, and gas or steam turbines or compressors. In addition to the traditional babbitt bearings, which were used since the early 20th century, new materials for the thrust pads have come into use. For example, Bronze and Copper-Chromium are commonly used to improve the bearing's performance.

== See also ==
- Needle roller bearing
- Plain bearing
- Race (bearing)
- Rolling-element bearing
- Slewing bearing

== Citations ==
=== References ===
- Simmons, J.E.L.; Henderson, N. (1990). "Developments in Naval Thrust Bearings". Journal of Naval Engineering. 32 (2): 344–353.
