= Spherical bearing =

Bearing that allow limited angular rotation orthogonal to the shaft axis

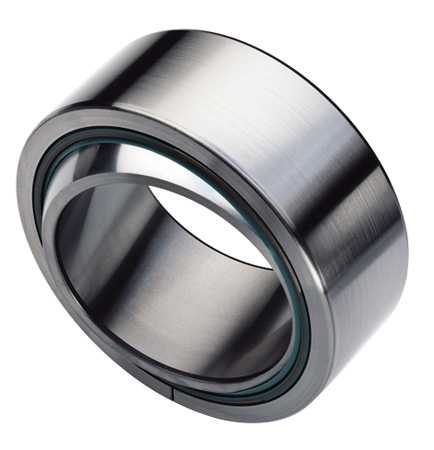
Spherical plain bearing

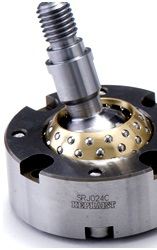
Spherical roller bearing, with rolling elements at the contact surface

A spherical bearing is a bearing that permits rotation about a central point in two orthogonal directions (usually within a specified angular limit based on the bearing geometry). Typically these bearings support a rotating shaft in the bore of the inner ring that must move not only rotationally, but also at an angle. It can either be a plain bearing or roller bearing.

Self-aligning spherical bearings were first used by James Nasmyth around 1840 to support line shaft bearings in mills and machine shops. For long shafts it was impossible to accurately align bearings, even if the shaft was perfectly straight. Nasmyth used brass bearing shells between hemispherical brass cups to allow the bearings to self-align.

== Construction ==
Spherical bearings can be of a hydrostatic or mechanical construction. A spherical bearing by itself consists of an outer ring and an inner ring and a locking feature that makes the inner ring captive within the outer ring in the axial direction only. The outer surface of the inner ring and the inner surface of the outer ring are spherical and are collectively considered the raceway and they slide against each other, either with a lubricant, a maintenance-free (typically polytetrafluoroethylene or PTFE) based liner, or they incorporate a rolling element such as a race of ball-bearings, allowing lower friction.

== Applications ==
Spherical bearings are used in car suspensions, engines, driveshafts, heavy machinery, sewing machines, robotics and many other applications: wherever rotational motion must be allowed to change the alignment of its rotation axis. An example, although this is rarely used in practice, is the drive axle bearings of a vehicle control arm (or A-arm) suspension. The mechanics of the suspension allow the axle to move up and down (and the wheel to turn in order to steer the vehicle), and the axle bearings must allow the rotational axis of the axle to change without binding. This is a simple concept that illustrates a possible application of a spherical bearing. In fact, spherical bearings are used in smaller sub-components of this type of suspension, for example certain types of constant-velocity joints.

== See also ==
- Ball joint – Spherical bearing most commonly used in automobile steering mechanisms
- Heim joint – Mechanical articulating joint
- Race (bearing) – Track in a bearing along which the rolling elements ride
- Self-aligning ball bearing – Type of rolling-element bearing
- Shaker tilting chair – Chair with swiveling feet – one of the earliest patented applications of this technology
- Spherical roller bearing – Rolling-element bearing that tolerates angular misalignment
