= Philip Vaughan =

Welsh inventor and ironmaster

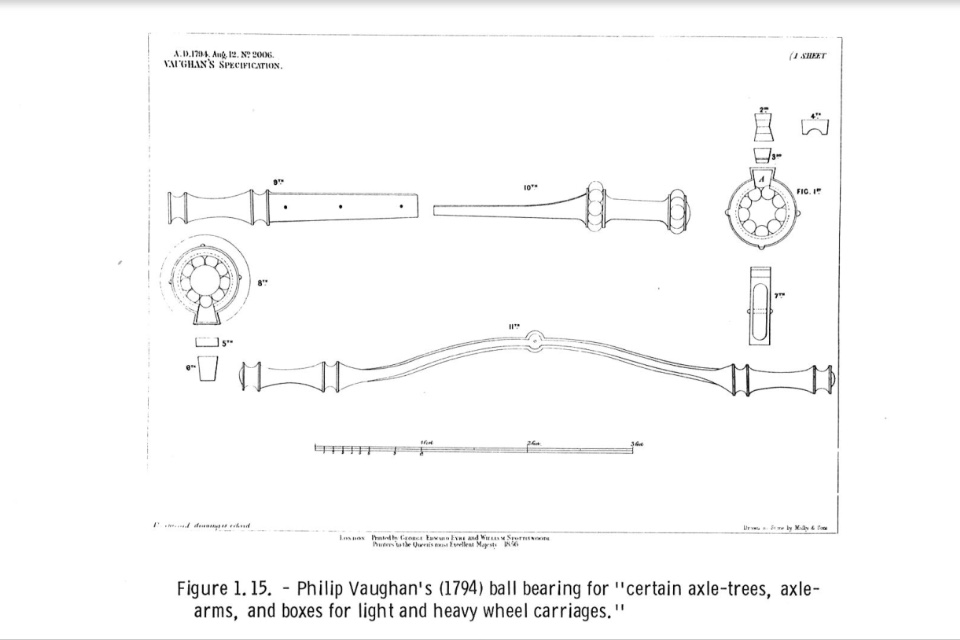

Philip Vaughan was a Welsh inventor and ironmaster who patented the first design for a ball bearing in 1794. Vaughan's patent described how iron balls could be placed between the wheel and the axle of a carriage. The balls let the carriage wheels rotate freely by reducing friction.

Vaughan was granted a patent in 1794 for a ball bearing that sits between the axle and the wheel on a carriage. His design has the balls running inside deep grooves, and sealed in place with a stopper.

Bearings are used in most rotating machines in the modern world - found throughout the rotating parts in cars, bikes, trains, planes etc. These modern ball bearings work in much the same way as Vaughan's initial invention. They make vehicles more efficient by reducing the friction between the moving parts. Without bearings, our mechanical world would simply not work.

Vaughan was a proprietor and agent of the iron foundry at Carmarthen and Kidwelly. He owned one house called Green Hall in the Four roads village near Kidwelly, and also used a Villa on Llangunnor hill, built for him by John Morgan Sr. He married Elizabeth Griffiths in 1793 in St Peter's Church, Carmarthen.

On January 1, 1800, Philip Vaughan signed a copartnership deed with John Morgan Junior, William and Thomas Morris, and William Morgan, the partners all agreeing to bring £12,000 in equal shares of £2,400 each. On the same day the co-partners started a 21-year lease for the Carmarthen rolling mills from John Morgan Sr. The lease included Kidwelly Forge, Blackpool Forge, the tin mills and various clauses for the watercourse leading to the Carmarthen works. Philip Vaughan was elected a burgess of Carmarthen on 2 October 1797. He died in 1824. His son, of the same name, went on to become a solicitor and mayor in Brecon.
