= Spherical roller bearing =

Rolling-element bearing that tolerates angular misalignment

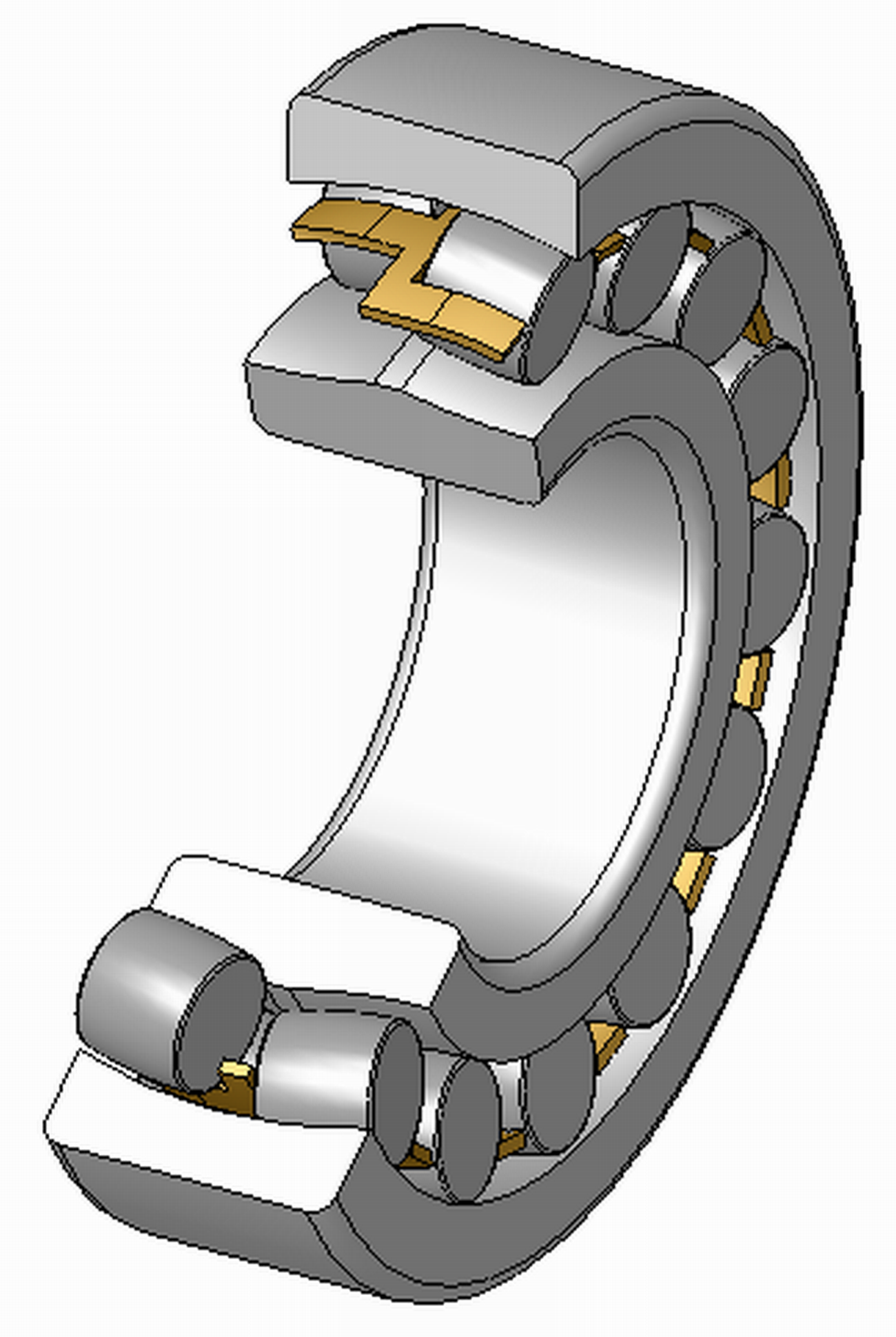
Spherical roller bearing with a brass cage in a cut-through view

A spherical roller bearing is a rolling-element bearing that permits rotation with low friction, and permits angular misalignment. Typically these bearings support a rotating shaft in the bore of the inner ring that may be misaligned in respect to the outer ring. The misalignment is permitted due to the spherical internal shape of the outer ring and spherical rollers. Despite what their name may imply, spherical roller bearings are not truly spherical in shape. The rolling elements of spherical roller bearings are mainly cylindrical in shape, but have a (barrel like) profile that makes them appear like cylinders that have been slightly over-inflated (i.e. like a barrel).

== Construction ==
Spherical roller bearings consist of an inner ring with two raceways inclined at an angle to the bearing axis, an outer ring with a common spherical raceway, spherical rollers, cages and, in certain designs, also internal guide rings or center rings. These bearings can also be sealed.

== History ==
The spherical roller bearing was invented by engineer Arvid Palmgren and was introduced on the market 1919 by SKF. The design of the bearing that Arvid Palmgren invented is similar to the design that is still in use in modern machines.

== Designs ==
Double-row spherical roller bearing with central flange

Single-row spherical roller bearing (barrel bearing)

Most spherical roller bearings are designed with two rows of rollers, allowing them to take very heavy radial loads and heavy axial loads. There are also designs with one row of rollers, suitable for lower radial loads and virtually no axial load. These are also called "barrel roller bearings" or "Tonnenlager" and are typically available in the 202- and 203-series.

The internal design of the bearing is not standardised by ISO, so it varies between different manufacturers and different series. Some features that may or may not exist in different bearings are:

- Lubrication features in inner or outer ring
- Central flange
- Guide ring or center ring
- Integrated seals
- Cage

== Dimensions ==
External dimensions of spherical roller bearings are standardised by ISO in the standard ISO 15:1998. Some of the common series of spherical roller bearings are: 213, 222, 223, 230, 231, 232, 238, 239, 240, 241, 248, 249.

== Materials ==
Bearing rings and rolling elements can be made of a number of different materials, but the most common is "chrome steel", (high carbon chromium) a material with approximately 1.5% chrome content. Such "chrome steel" has been standardized by a number of authorities, and there are therefore a number of similar materials, such as: AISI 52100 (USA), 100CR6 (Germany), SUJ2 (Japan) and GCR15 (China).

Some common materials for bearing cages:

- Sheet steel (stamped or laser-cut)
- Polyamide (injection molded)
- Brass (stamped or machined)
- Steel (machined)

The choice of material is mainly done by the manufacturing volume and method. For large-volume bearings, cages are often of stamped sheet-metal or injection molded polyamide, whereas low volume manufacturers or low volume series often have cages of machined brass or machined steel. For some specific applications, special material for coating (e.g. PTFE coated cylindrical bore for vibratory applications) is adopted.

== Manufacturers ==
Some manufacturers of spherical roller bearings are SKF, Schaeffler, Timken Company, NSK Ltd., NTN Corporation and JTEKT.

Since SKF introduced the spherical roller bearing in 1919, spherical roller bearings have purposefully been refined through the decades to improve carrying capacity and to reduce operational friction. This has been possible by playing with a palette of parameters such as materials, internal geometry, tolerance and lubricant. Nowadays, spherical roller bearing manufacturers are striving to refine the bearing knowledge towards more environmentally-friendly and energy-efficient solutions.

== Applications ==
Spherical bearings are used in countless industrial applications where there are heavy loads, moderate speeds and possibly misalignment. Some common application areas are:

- Gearboxes
- Wind turbines
- Continuous casting machines
- Material handling
- Pumps
- Mechanical fans and blowers
- Mining and construction equipment
- Pulp and paper processing equipment
- Marine propulsion and offshore drilling
- Off-road vehicles

== See also ==
- Bearing (mechanical) – Mechanism to constrain relative movement to the desired motion and reduce friction
- Rolling-element bearing – Load-carrying bearing using rolling elements and rings
- Self-aligning ball bearing – Type of rolling-element bearing
- Spherical plain bearing – Bearing that allow limited angular rotation orthogonal to the shaft axis
- Spherical roller thrust bearing – Type of roller bearing which supports axial loads and permits angular misalignment
- Tapered roller bearing – Type of roller bearing which can support axial loads
