= Aerospace bearing =

Aircraft part

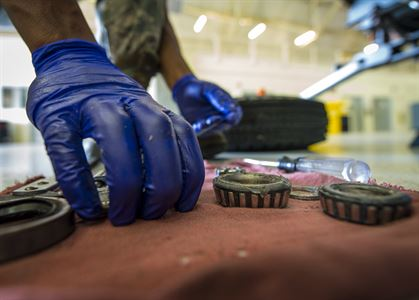
US Airman cleans thrust bearings, an example of aerospace bearings.

Aerospace bearings are the bearings installed in aircraft and aerospace systems including commercial, private, military, or space applications.

Materials include M50 tool steel (AMS6491), carbon chrome steel (AMS6444), the corrosion resistant AMS5930, 440C stainless steel, silicon nitride (ceramic) and titanium carbide-coated 440C.

Typically, special attention is given to the material specification, non-destructive testing, and to the traceability of the bearing (a system of documents that enables an engineer to trace a bearing, typically back to its manufacturing batch and material supply).

== Design ==
When designing aerospace bearings, it is important to take a few things into account, including:

- material standard
- design
- lubrication type
- surface coatings and treatments
- non-destructive testing
- traceability

In order to assure bearing performance, it is necessary for the bearing steel to be of high quality. Jet engine bearings are typically manufactured from metals manufactured using a vacuum arc remelt to enable material requirements to be met.

Jet engine shaft bearings and accessory drive shaft bearings typically use single piece or two piece machined retainers. The pressed steel or moulded retainers found on mass-produced bearings are not used.

Temperature and moisture resistant oils, greases and lubricants are normally specified. If the lubricant is not correct the performance of the bearing will be compromised.

== Application ==
In jet engines bearings can operate at over 200 degrees Celsius (400 °F) and at speeds over 10,000 rpm for the turbine shafts to over 30,000 rpm in the accessory drives. In wing control surface applications temperatures as low as −55 °C (−67 °F) may be encountered.

== Monitoring ==
Bearings are a vital factor in many products and assemblies and their performance is often monitored continuously. In jet engines the oil supply is monitored to detect the presence of metallic debris that could identify a failure either of the bearings or of other components whose failure may contaminate the bearings.
