= Ball bearing =

Type of rolling-element bearing

Working principle for a ball bearing; red dots show direction of rotation.

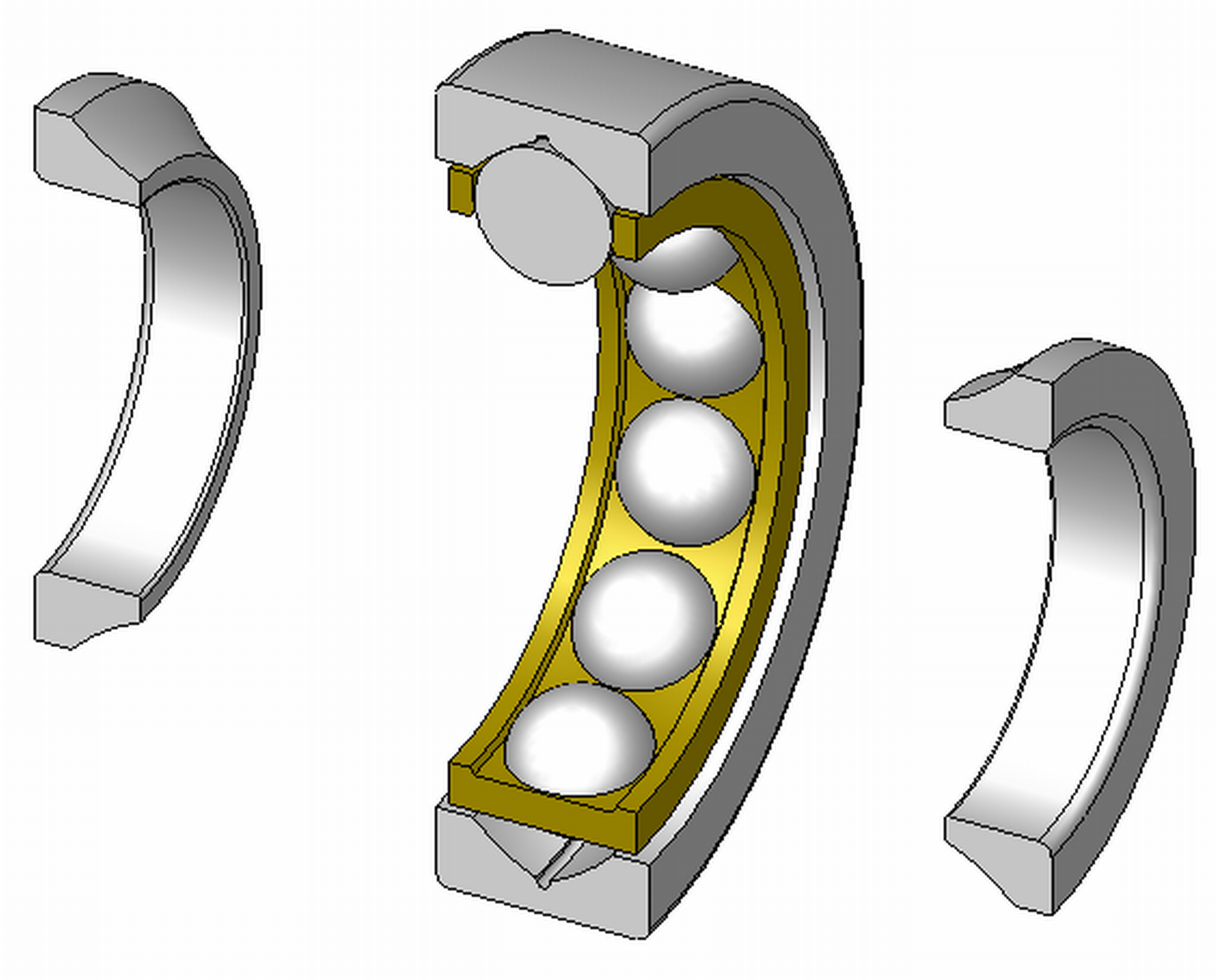
A four-point angular-contact ball bearing

A ball bearing is a type of rolling-element bearing that uses balls to maintain the separation between the bearing races.

The purpose of a ball bearing is to reduce rotational friction and support radial and axial loads. It achieves this by using at least two races to contain the balls and transmit the loads through the balls. In most applications, one race is stationary and the other is attached to the rotating assembly (e.g., a hub or shaft). As one of the bearing races rotates it causes the balls to rotate as well. Because the balls are rolling, they have a much lower coefficient of friction than if two flat surfaces were sliding against each other.

Ball bearings tend to have lower load capacity for their size than other kinds of rolling-element bearings due to the smaller contact area between the balls and races. However, they can tolerate some misalignment of the inner and outer races.

Common ball bearing designs include angular contact, axial, deep-groove, and preloaded pairs. The balls in ball bearings can also be configured in various ways. Ball bearings are used in a wide range of applications, some of which include skateboards and centrifugal pumps.

== History ==
Although bearings had been developed since ancient times, the first modern recorded patent on ball bearings was awarded to Philip Vaughan, a Welsh inventor and ironmaster who created the first design for a ball bearing in Carmarthen in 1794. His is the first modern ball-bearing design, with the ball running along a groove in the axle assembly.

Jules Suriray, a Parisian bicycle mechanic, designed the first radial style ball bearing in 1869, which was then fitted to the winning bicycle ridden by James Moore in the world's first bicycle road race, Paris-Rouen, in November 1869.

== Common designs ==
There are several common designs of ball bearing, each offering various performance trade-offs. They can be made from many different materials, including stainless steel, chrome steel, and ceramic (silicon nitride, Si_{3}N_{4}). A hybrid ball bearing is a bearing with ceramic balls and metal races.

=== Angular contact ===
An angular contact ball bearing uses axially asymmetric races. An axial load passes in a straight line through the bearing, whereas a radial load takes an oblique path that acts to separate the races axially. So, the angle of contact on the inner race is the same as that on the outer race. Angular contact bearings better support combined loads (loading in both the radial and axial directions) and the contact angle of the bearing should be matched to the relative proportions of each. The larger the contact angle (typically in the range 10 to 45 degrees), the higher the axial load supported, but the lower the radial load. In high-speed applications, such as turbines, jet engines, and dentistry equipment, the centrifugal forces generated by the balls change the contact angle at the inner and outer race. Ceramics such as silicon nitride are now regularly used in such applications due to their low density (40% of steel). These materials significantly reduce centrifugal force and function well in high temperature environments. They also tend to wear in a similar way to bearing steel—rather than cracking or shattering like glass or porcelain. Most bicycles use angular-contact bearings in the headsets because the forces on these bearings are in both the radial and axial direction.

=== Axial ===
An axial or thrust ball bearing uses side-by-side races. An axial load is transmitted directly through the bearing, while a radial load is poorly supported and tends to separate the races, so that a larger radial load is likely to damage the bearing.

=== Deep-groove ===
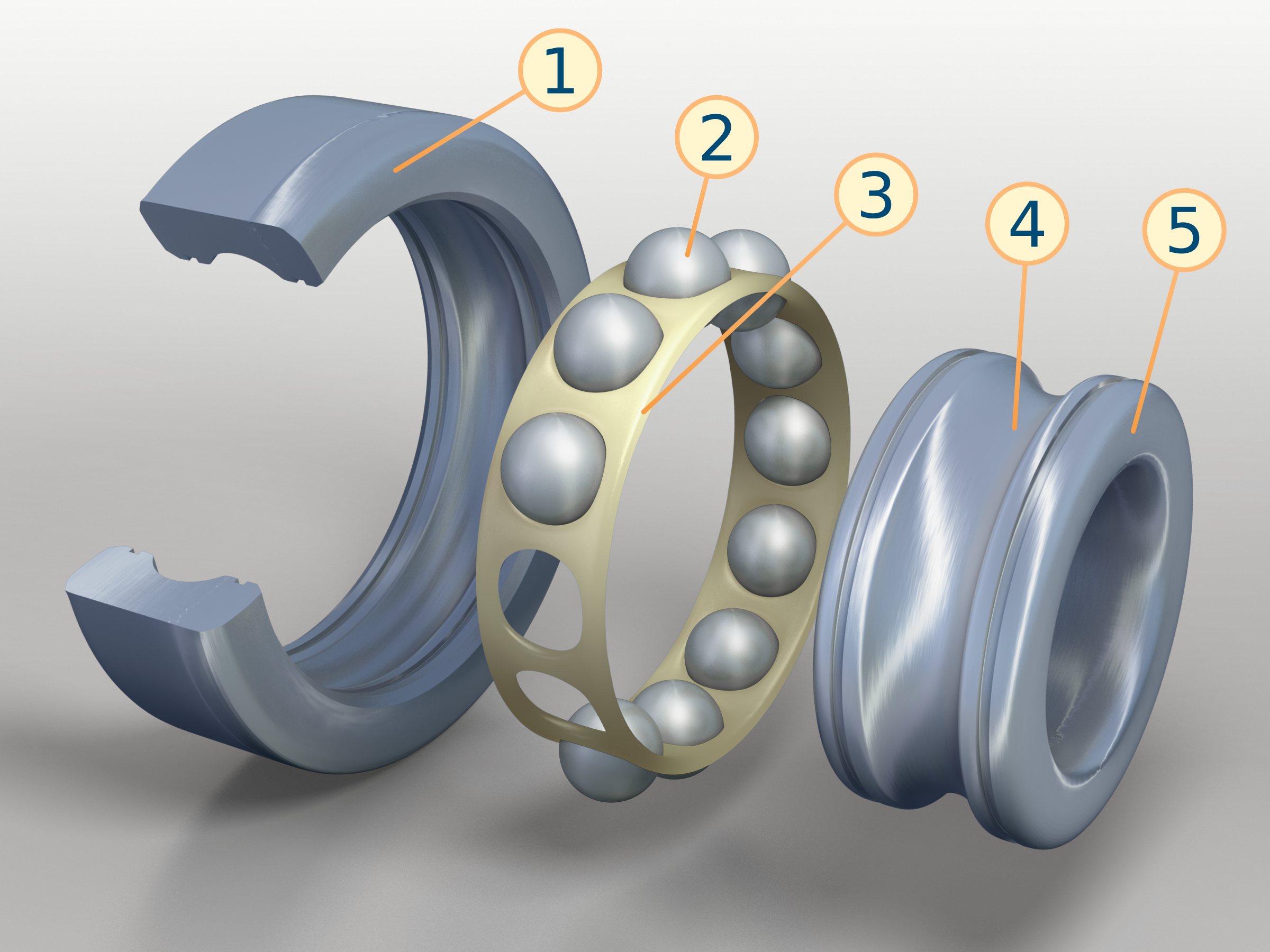
Grooves & balls

In a deep-groove radial bearing, the race dimensions are close to the dimensions of the balls that run in it. Deep-groove bearings support higher loads than a shallower groove. Like angular contact bearings, deep-groove bearings support both radial and axial loads, but without a choice of contact angle to allow choice of relative proportion of these load capacities.

=== Preloaded pairs ===
Preloading of a pair of bearings in a wheel assembly of an inline skate

The above basic types of bearings are typically applied in a method of preloaded pairs, where two individual bearings are rigidly fastened along a rotating shaft to face each other. This improves the axial runout by taking up (preloading) the necessary slight clearance between the bearing balls and races. Pairing also provides an advantage of evenly distributing the loads, nearly doubling the total load capacity compared to a single bearing. Angular contact bearings are almost always used in opposing pairs: the asymmetric design of each bearing supports axial loads in only one direction, so an opposed pair is required if the application demands support in both directions. The preloading force must be designed and assembled carefully, because it deducts from the axial force capacity of the bearings and can damage bearings if applied excessively. The pairing mechanism may simply face the bearings together directly, or separate them with a shim, bushing, or shaft feature.

== Construction types ==
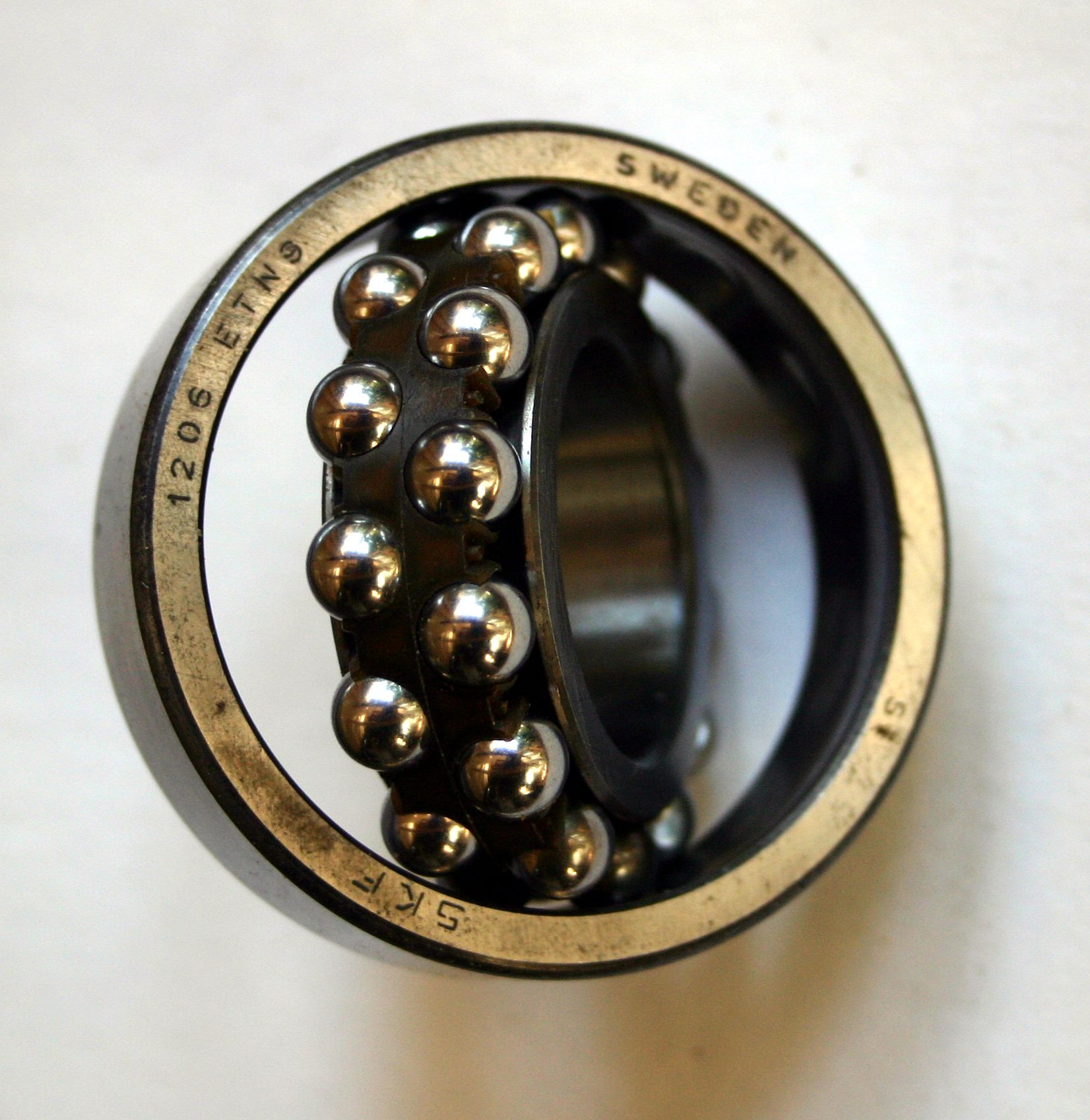
Wingqvist developed a self-aligning ball bearing

Wingqvist's self-aligning ball bearing

Conrad
The Conrad-style ball bearing is named after its inventor, Robert Conrad, who was awarded British patent 12,206 in 1903 and U.S. patent 822,723 in 1906. These bearings are assembled by placing the inner ring into an eccentric position relative to the outer ring, with the two rings in contact at one point, resulting in a large gap opposite the point of contact. The balls are inserted through the gap and then evenly distributed around the bearing assembly, causing the rings to become concentric. Assembly is completed by fitting a cage to the balls to maintain their positions relative to each other. Without the cage, the balls would eventually drift out of position during operation, causing the bearing to fail. The cage carries no load and serves only to maintain ball position. Conrad bearings have the advantage that they are able to withstand both radial and axial loads but have the disadvantage of lower load capacity due to the limited number of balls that can be loaded into the bearing assembly. Probably the most familiar industrial ball bearing is the deep-groove Conrad style. The bearing is used in most of the mechanical industries.
Slot-fill
In a slot-fill radial bearing, the inner and outer races are notched on one face so that when the notches are aligned, balls can be slipped in the resulting slot to assemble the bearing. A slot-fill bearing has the advantage that more balls can be assembled (even allowing a full complement design), resulting in a higher radial load capacity than a Conrad bearing of the same dimensions and material type. However, a slot-fill bearing cannot carry a significant axial load, and the slots cause a discontinuity in the races that can have a small but adverse effect on strength.
Relieved race
Relieved race ball bearings are 'relieved' as the name suggests by having either the OD of the inner ring reduced on one side, or the ID of the outer ring increased on one side. This allows a greater number of balls to be assembled into either the inner or outer race, and then press fit over the relief. Sometimes the outer ring will be heated to facilitate assembly. Like the slot-fill construction, relieved race construction allows a greater number of balls than Conrad construction, up to and including full complement, and the extra ball count gives extra load capacity. However, a relieved race bearing can only support significant axial loads in one direction ('away from' the relieved race).
Fractured race
Another way of fitting more balls into a radial ball bearing is by radially 'fracturing' (slicing) one of the rings all the way through, loading the balls in, re-assembling the fractured portion, and then using a pair of steel bands to hold the fractured ring sections together in alignment. Again, this allows more balls, including full ball complement, however unlike with either slot fill or relieved race constructions, it can support significant axial loading in either direction.
Wire race
Four wire rings are arranged in a square, to contact four points on a ball bearing. The wire rings are bearing steel and are ground smooth where they contact the bearing balls. The wires cannot support bearing loads directly, so are placed in a housing. The housing may be a material which is not suitable for bearings but has other useful properties. For example, wires in an aluminum housing may be lighter than a similar-size bearing made entirely of steel. There are also 3-wire, linear, and other wire race bearings.
Rows
There are two row designs: single-row bearings and double-row bearings. Most ball bearings are a single-row design, which means there is one row of bearing balls. This design works with radial and thrust loads. A double-row design has two rows of bearing balls. Advantages of double-row bearings as compared to single-row include that they can bear radial and axial loads in both directions. Double-row angular contact ball bearings have a steep mounting, which also can bear tilting effects. Other advantages of double-row bearings are their rigidity and compactness. Their disadvantage is they need better alignment than single-row bearings.
Flanged
Bearings with a flange on the outer ring simplify axial location. The housing for such bearings can consist of a through-hole of uniform diameter, but the entry face of the housing (which may be either the outer or inner face) must be machined truly normal to the hole axis. However, such flanges are very expensive to manufacture. A more cost-effective arrangement of the bearing outer ring, with similar benefits, is a snap ring groove at either or both ends of the outside diameter. The snap ring assumes the function of a flange.
Caged
Cages are typically used to secure the balls in a Conrad-style ball bearing. In other construction types they may decrease the number of balls depending on the specific cage shape, and thus reduce the load capacity. Without cages the tangential position is stabilized by sliding of two convex surfaces on each other. With a cage the tangential position is stabilized by a sliding of a convex surface in a matched concave surface, which avoids dents in the balls and has lower friction. Caged roller bearings were invented by John Harrison in the mid-18th century as part of his work on chronographs.
Hybrid ball bearings using ceramic balls
Ceramic bearing balls can weigh up to 40% less than steel ones, depending on size and material. This reduces centrifugal loading and skidding, so hybrid ceramic bearings can operate 20% to 40% faster than conventional bearings. This means that the outer race groove exerts less force inward against the ball as the bearing spins. This reduction in force reduces the friction and rolling resistance. The lighter balls allow the bearing to spin faster, and uses less power to maintain its speed. The ceramic balls are typically harder than the race. Due to wear, with time they will form a groove in the race. This is preferable to the balls wearing which would leave them with possible flat spots significantly harming performance. While ceramic hybrid bearings use ceramic balls in place of steel ones, they are constructed with steel inner and outer rings; hence the hybrid designation. While the ceramic material itself is stronger than steel, it is also stiffer, which results in increased stresses on the rings, and hence decreased load capacity. Ceramic balls are electrically insulating, which can prevent 'arcing' failures if current should be passed through the bearing. Ceramic balls can also be effective in environments where lubrication may not be available (such as in space applications). In some settings only a thin coating of ceramic is used over a metal ball bearing.
Fully ceramic bearings
These bearings make use of both ceramic balls and race. These bearings are impervious to corrosion and rarely require lubrication if at all. Due to the stiffness and hardness of the balls and race these bearings are noisy at high speeds. The stiffness of the ceramic makes these bearings brittle and liable to crack under load or impact. Because both ball and race are of similar hardness, wear can lead to chipping at high speeds of both the balls and the race, which can cause sparking.
Self-aligning
Self-aligning ball bearings, such as the Wingqvist bearing shown in the picture, are constructed with the inner ring and ball assembly contained within an outer ring that has a spherical raceway. This construction allows the bearing to tolerate a small angular misalignment resulting from shaft or housing deflections or improper mounting. The bearing was used mainly in bearing arrangements with very long shafts, such as transmission shafts in textile factories. One drawback of the self-aligning ball bearings is a limited load rating, as the outer raceway has very low osculation (its radius is much larger than the ball radius). This led to the invention of the spherical roller bearing, which has a similar design, but uses rollers instead of balls. The spherical roller thrust bearing is another invention derived from the findings by Wingqvist.

== Operating conditions ==
=== Lifespan ===
The calculated life for a bearing is based on the load it carries and its operating speed. The industry standard usable bearing lifespan is inversely proportional to the bearing load cubed. Nominal maximum load of a bearing, is for a lifespan of 1 million rotations, which at 50 Hz (i.e., 3000 RPM) is a lifespan of 5.5 working hours. 90% of bearings of that type have at least that lifespan, and 50% of bearings have a lifespan at least 5 times as long.

The industry standard life calculation is based upon the work of Lundberg and Palmgren performed in 1947. The formula assumes the life to be limited by metal fatigue and that the life distribution can be described by a Weibull distribution. Many variations of the formula exist that include factors for material properties, lubrication, and loading. Factoring for loading may be viewed as a tacit admission that modern materials demonstrate a different relationship between load and life than Lundberg and Palmgren determined .

=== Failure modes ===
If a bearing is not rotating, maximum load is determined by force that causes plastic deformation of elements or raceways. The indentations caused by the elements can concentrate stresses and generate cracks at the components. Maximum load for not or very slowly rotating bearings is called "static" maximum load.

Also, if a bearing is not rotating, oscillating forces on the bearing can cause impact damage to the bearing race or the rolling elements, known as brinelling. A second lesser form called false brinelling occurs if the bearing only rotates across a short arc and pushes lubricant out away from the rolling elements.

For a rotating bearing, the dynamic load capacity indicates the load to which the bearing endures 1,000,000 cycles.

If a bearing is rotating, but experiences heavy load that lasts shorter than one revolution, static max load must be used in computations, since the bearing does not rotate during the maximum load.

If a sideways torque is applied to a deep groove radial bearing, an uneven force in the shape of an ellipse is applied on the outer ring by the rolling elements, concentrating in two regions on opposite sides of the outer ring. If the outer ring is not strong enough, or if it is not sufficiently braced by the supporting structure, the outer ring will deform into an oval shape from the sideways torque stress, until the gap is large enough for the rolling elements to escape. The inner ring then pops out and the bearing structurally collapses.

A sideways torque on a radial bearing also applies pressure to the cage that holds the rolling elements at equal distances, due to the rolling elements trying to all slide together at the location of highest sideways torque. If the cage collapses or breaks apart, the rolling elements group together, the inner ring loses support, and may pop out of the center.

=== Maximum load ===
In general, maximum load on a ball bearing is proportional to outer diameter of the bearing times the width of the bearing (where width is measured in direction of axle).

Bearings have static load ratings. These are based on not exceeding a certain amount of plastic deformation in the raceway. These ratings may be exceeded by a large amount for certain applications.

=== Lubrication ===
For a bearing to operate properly, it needs to be lubricated. In most cases the lubricant is based on elastohydrodynamic effect (by oil or grease) but working at extreme temperatures dry lubricated bearings are also available.

For a bearing to have its nominal lifespan at its nominal maximum load, it must be lubricated with a lubricant (oil or grease) that has at least the minimum dynamic viscosity (usually denoted with the Greek letter $\nu$) recommended for that bearing.

The recommended dynamic viscosity is inversely proportional to diameter of bearing.

The recommended dynamic viscosity decreases with rotating frequency. As a rough indication: for less than 3000 RPM, recommended viscosity increases with factor 6 for a factor 10 decrease in speed, and for more than 3000 RPM, recommended viscosity decreases with factor 3 for a factor 10 increase in speed.

For a bearing where average of outer diameter of bearing and diameter of axle hole is 50 mm, and that is rotating at 3000 RPM, recommended dynamic viscosity is 12 mm^{2}/s.

Note that dynamic viscosity of oil varies strongly with temperature: a temperature increase of 50–70 °C causes the viscosity to decrease by factor 10.

If the viscosity of lubricant is higher than recommended, lifespan of bearing increases, roughly proportional to square root of viscosity. If the viscosity of the lubricant is lower than recommended, the lifespan of the bearing decreases, and by how much depends on which type of oil being used. For oils with EP ('extreme pressure') additives, the lifespan is proportional to the square root of dynamic viscosity, just as it was for too high viscosity, while for ordinary oils lifespan is proportional to the square of the viscosity if a lower-than-recommended viscosity is used.

Lubrication can be done with a grease, which has advantages that grease is normally held within the bearing releasing the lubricant oil as it is compressed by the balls. It provides a protective barrier for the bearing metal from the environment, but has disadvantages that this grease must be replaced periodically, and maximum load of bearing decreases (because if bearing gets too warm, grease melts and runs out of bearing). Time between grease replacements decreases very strongly with diameter of bearing: for a 40 mm bearing, grease should be replaced every 5000 working hours, while for a 100 mm bearing it should be replaced every 500 working hours.

Lubrication can also be done with an oil, which has advantage of higher maximum load, but needs some way to keep oil in bearing, as it normally tends to run out of it. For oil lubrication it is recommended that for applications where oil does not become warmer than 50 °C, oil should be replaced once a year, while for applications where oil does not become warmer than 100 °C, oil should be replaced 4 times per year. For car engines, oil becomes 100 °C but the engine has an oil filter to maintain oil quality; therefore, the oil is usually changed less frequently than the oil in bearings.

If the bearing is used under oscillation, oil lubrication should be preferred. If grease lubrication is necessary, the composition should be adapted to the parameters that occur. Greases with a high bleeding rate and low base oil viscosity should be preferred if possible.

=== Direction of load ===
Most bearings are meant for supporting loads perpendicular to axle ("radial loads"). Whether they can also bear axial loads, and if so, how much, depends on the type of bearing. Thrust bearings (commonly found on lazy susans) are specifically designed for axial loads.

For single-row deep-groove ball bearings, SKF's documentation says that maximum axial load is circa 50% of maximum radial load, but it also says that "light" and/or "small" bearings can take axial loads that are 25% of maximum radial load.

For single-row edge-contact ball bearings, axial load can be about 2 times max radial load, and for cone-bearings maximum axial load is between 1 and 2 times maximum radial load.

Often Conrad-style ball bearings will exhibit contact ellipse truncation under axial load. That means that either the ID of the outer ring is large enough, or the OD of the inner ring is small enough, so as to reduce the area of contact between the balls and raceway. When this is the case, it can significantly increase the stresses in the bearing, often invalidating rules of thumb regarding relationships between radial and axial load capacity. With construction types other than Conrad, one can further decrease the outer ring ID and increase the inner ring OD to guard against this.

If both axial and radial loads are present, they can be added vectorially, to result in the total load on bearing, which in combination with nominal maximum load can be used to predict lifespan. However, in order to correctly predict the rating life of ball bearings the ISO/TS 16281 should be used with the help of a calculation software.

=== Avoiding undesirable axial load ===
The part of a bearing that rotates (either axle hole or outer circumference) must be fixed, while for a part that does not rotate this is not necessary (so it can be allowed to slide). If a bearing is loaded axially, both sides must be fixed.

If an axle has two bearings, and temperature varies, axle shrinks or expands, therefore it is not admissible for both bearings to be fixed on both their sides, since expansion of axle would exert axial forces that would destroy these bearings. Therefore, at least one of the bearings must be able to slide.

A 'freely sliding fit' is one where there is at least a 4 μm clearance, presumably because surface-roughness of a surface made on a lathe is normally between 1.6 and 3.2 μm.

=== Fit ===
Bearings can withstand their maximum load only if the mating parts are properly sized. Bearing manufacturers supply tolerances for the fit of the shaft and the housing so that this can be achieved. The material and hardness may also be specified.

Fittings that are not allowed to slip are made to diameters that prevent slipping and consequently the mating surfaces cannot be brought into position without force. For small bearings this is best done with a press because tapping with a hammer damages both bearing and shaft, while for large bearings the necessary forces are so great that there is no alternative to heating one part before fitting, so that thermal expansion allows a temporary sliding fit.

=== Avoiding torsional loads ===
If a shaft is supported by two bearings, and the center-lines of rotation of these bearings are not the same, then large forces are exerted on the bearing, which may destroy it. Some very small amount of misalignment is acceptable, and how much depends on type of bearing. For bearings that are specifically made to be 'self-aligning', acceptable misalignment is between 1.5 and 3 degrees of arc. Bearings that are not designed to be self-aligning can accept misalignment of only 2–10 minutes of arc (0.033-0.166 degrees) .

== Applications ==
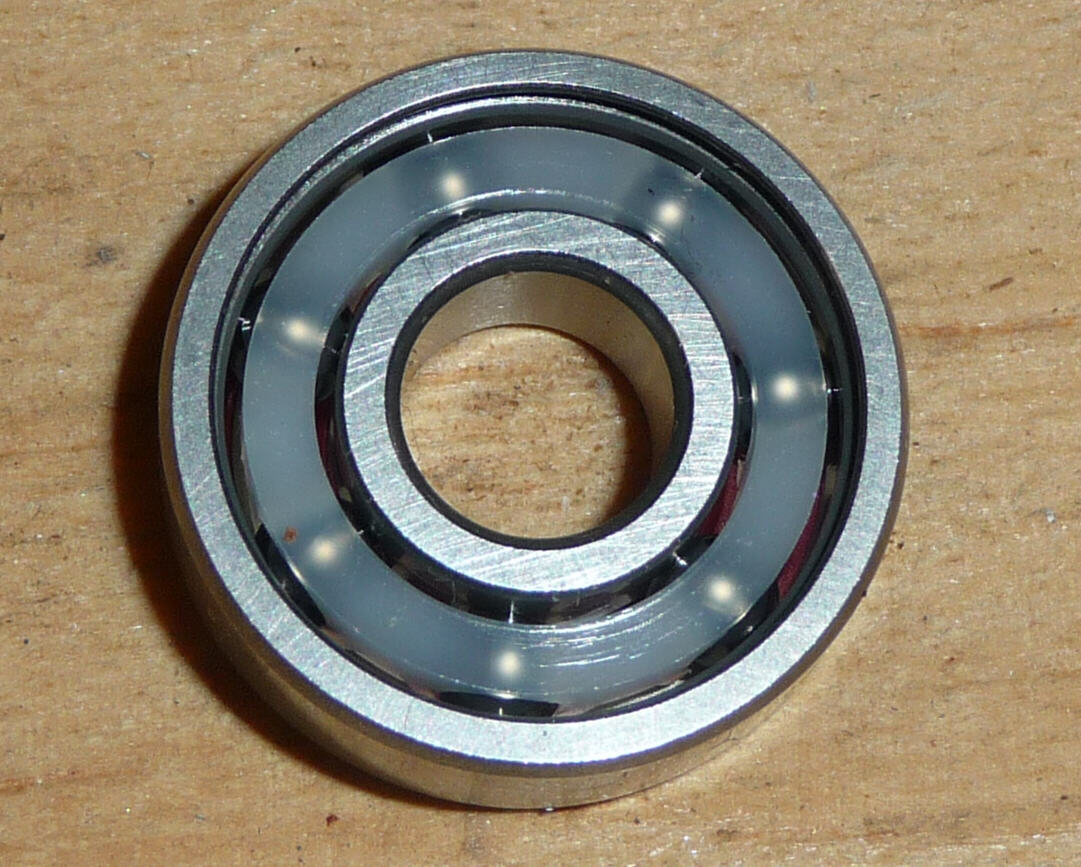
A ball bearing for skateboard wheels with a plastic cage

In general, ball bearings are used in most applications that involve moving parts. Some of these applications have specific features and requirements:

- Computer fan and spinning device bearings used to be highly spherical and were said to be the best spherical manufactured shapes, but this is no longer true for hard disk drive, and more and more are being replaced with fluid bearings.
- In horology, the Jean Lassale company designed a watch movement that used ball bearings to reduce the thickness of the movement. Using 0.20 mm balls, the Calibre 1200 was only 1.2 mm thick, which still is the thinnest mechanical watch movement.
- Aerospace bearings are used in many applications on commercial, private and military aircraft including pulleys, gearboxes and jet engine shafts. Materials include M50 tool steel (AMS6491), carbon chrome steel (AMS6444), the corrosion resistant AMS5930, 440C stainless steel, silicon nitride (ceramic) and titanium carbide-coated 440C.
- A skateboard wheel contains two bearings, which are subject to both axial and radial time-varying loads. Most commonly bearing 608-2Z is used (a deep groove ball bearing from series 60 with 8 mm bore diameter)
- Many yo-yos, ranging from beginner to professional or competition grade, incorporate ball bearings.
- Many fidget spinner toys use multiple ball bearings to add weight, and to allow the toy to spin.
- In centrifugal pumps.
- Railroad locomotive axle journals. Side rod action of newest high speed steam locomotives before railroads were converted to diesel engines.

== Designation ==
The ball size increases as the series increases, for any given inner diameter or outer diameter (not both). The larger the ball the greater the load carrying capacity. Series 200 and 300 are the most common.

== See also ==
- Ball screw – Low-friction linear actuator
- Bearing Specialists Association – American industry trade group
- Linear-motion bearing – Mechanical bearing designed to provide free motion in one direction
- Roller bearing
