= Tapered roller bearing =

Type of roller bearing which can support axial loads

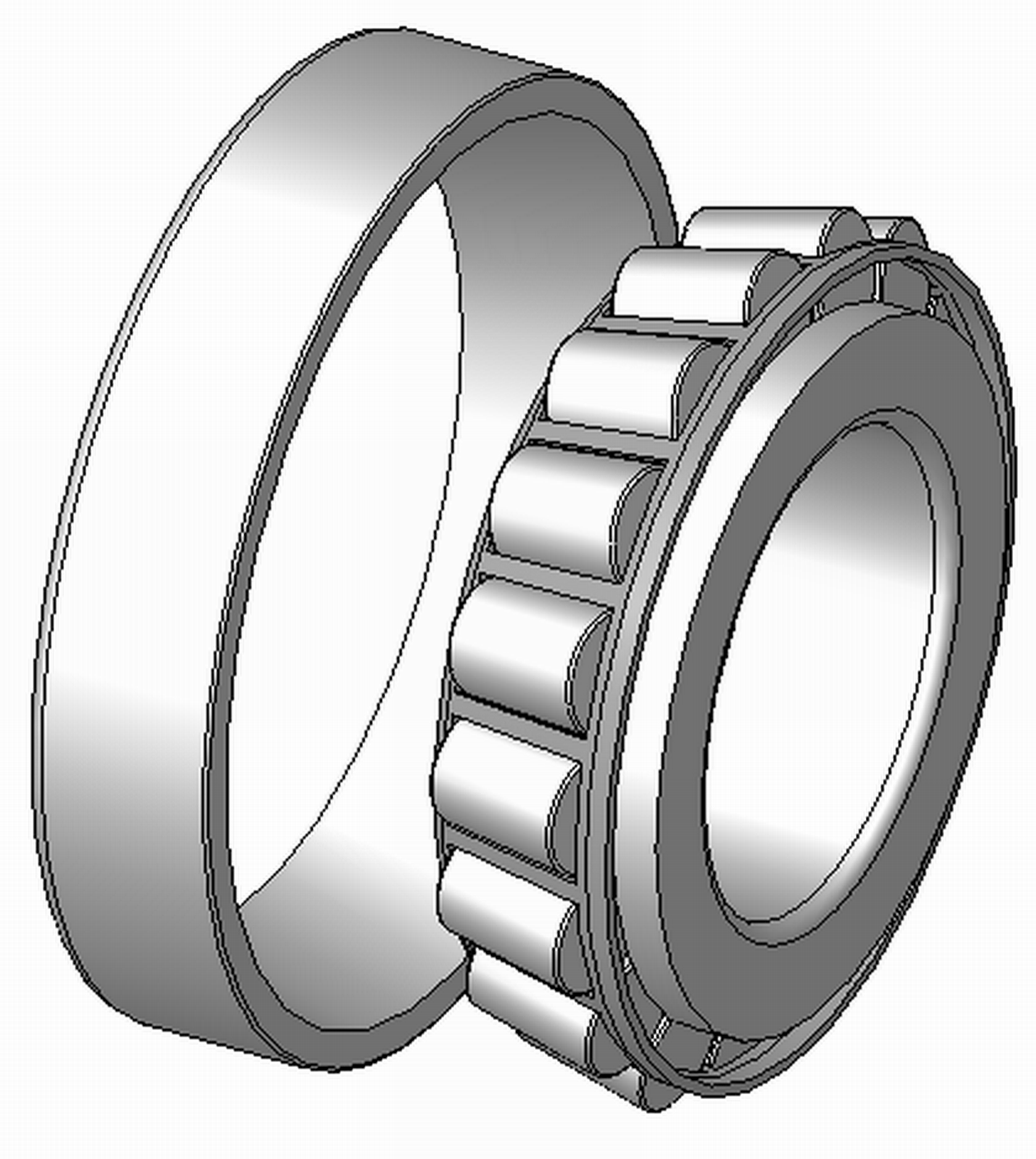
A single tapered roller bearing

Tapered roller bearings are based on the observation that cones that meet at a point can roll over each other without slipping. In practice, sections of cones are used.

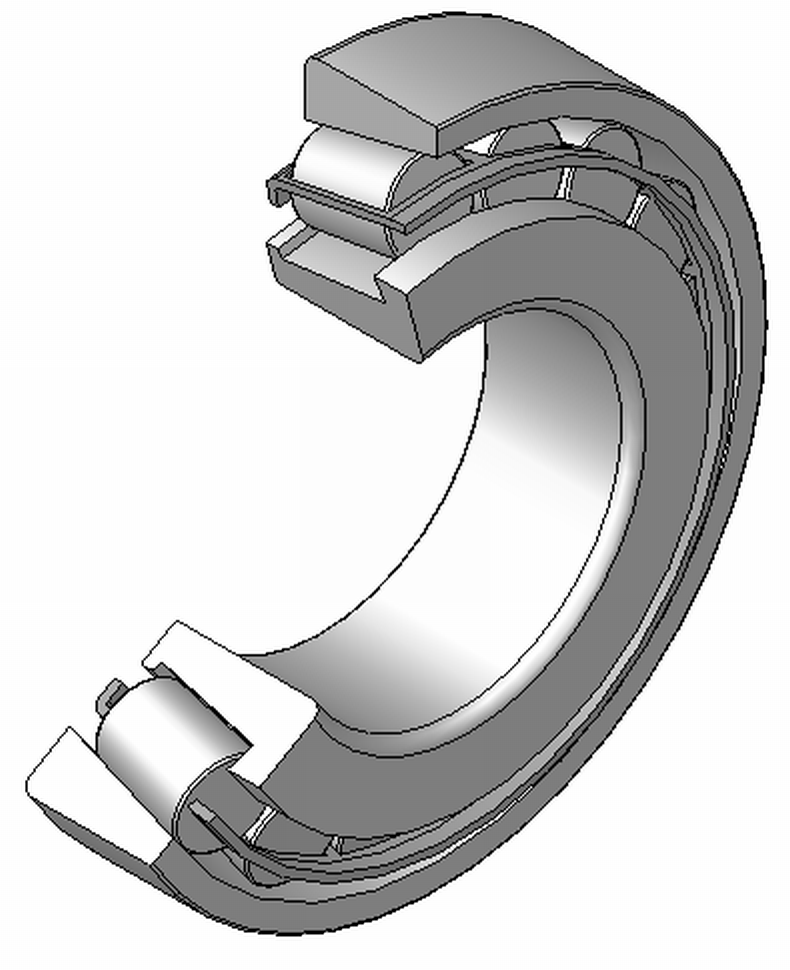
Cutaway view of a tapered roller bearing

Tapered roller bearings are rolling element bearings that can support axial forces (i.e., they are good thrust bearings) as well as radial forces.

== Description ==
The inner and outer ring raceways are segments of cones and the rollers are tapered so that the conical surfaces of the raceways, and the roller axes, if projected, would all meet at a common point on the main axis of the bearing. This geometry makes the motion of the cones remain coaxial, with no sliding motion between the raceways and the outside diameter of the rollers.

This conical geometry creates a linear contact patch which permits greater loads to be carried than with spherical (ball) bearings, which have point contact. The geometry means that the tangential speeds of the surfaces of each of the rollers are the same as their raceways along the whole length of the contact patch and no differential scrubbing occurs.

The rollers are stabilized and restrained by a flange on the inner ring, against which their large end slides, which stops the rollers from popping out due to the "pumpkin seed effect" of their conical shape.

The larger the half angles of these cones the larger the axial force that the bearing can sustain.

Tapered roller bearings are separable into a cone assembly and a cup. The non-separable cone assembly consists of the inner ring, the rollers, and a cage that retains and evenly spaces the rollers. The cup is simply the outer ring. Internal clearance is established during mounting by the axial position of the cone relative to the cup, although preloaded installations without clearance are common.

Metric tapered roller bearings follow the designation system defined by ISO 355.

== History ==
On March 23, 1895, John Lincoln Scott, a farmer and carpenter from Wilmot, Indiana applied for a patent from the United States Patent Office for his invention of a roller bearing that fit on "the axle-skeins and hubs of wagons, buggies, or other wheeled vehicles". The bearing was composed of two sets of cylindrical rollers, one set larger in diameter than the other, that fit on flats machined on the tapered axle-skein. In 1898, Henry Timken was awarded a patent for the tapered roller bearing which used conical rollers. At the time, Timken was a carriage-maker in St. Louis and held three patents for carriage springs. However, it was his patent for tapered roller bearings that allowed his company to become successful.

Tapered roller bearings were a breakthrough at the end of the 19th century because bearings used in wheel axles had not changed much since ancient times. They consisted of a cylindrical seat on the frame and part of the axle enclosed in a case or box that held a lubricant. These were called journal bearings and relied on the lubricant to form a fluid bearing. Without adequate lubrication, journal bearings would fail due to the excessive heat caused by friction. Timken was able to significantly reduce the friction on his axle bearings by adding tapered elements which actually rolled while transferring the load evenly from axle to frame through the hardened steel inner and outer rings and the rollers – his tapered roller bearing.

The tapered roller bearing in combination with modern lubricants is extremely durable and is used almost universally in applications involving rotating axle and transmission shafts. Bearing durability is such that these shafts often require no maintenance for hundreds of thousands of kilometers of operation.

== Applications ==
In many applications tapered roller bearings are used in back-to-back pairs so that axial forces can be supported equally in either direction.

Pairs of tapered roller bearings are used in car and vehicle wheel bearings where they must cope simultaneously with large vertical (radial) and horizontal (axial) forces. Tapered roller bearings are commonly used for moderate speed, heavy duty applications where durability is required. Common real world applications are in agriculture, construction and mining equipment, sports robot combat, axle systems, gear box, engine motors and reducers, propeller shaft, railroad axle-box, differential, wind turbines, etc. A tapered roller bearing is a unit that consists of both tapered raceways (inner and outer rings), and tapered rollers. The construction is intended for combination loads, such as dual acting axial and radial loads. The bearing axis is where the projected lines of the raceway combine at a common location to improve rolling, while reducing friction. The load capacity can be increased or decreased depending on the contact angle being increased or decreased. The higher the degree of angle, the greater the contact angle. They are commonly used in pairs for better radial load handling, and in some heavy duty applications, can be found in two or four rows combined in a single unit.

== See also ==
- Ball bearing
- Brinelling
- Roller bearing
- Timken Company
