= Rolling-element bearing =

Load-carrying bearing using rolling elements and rings

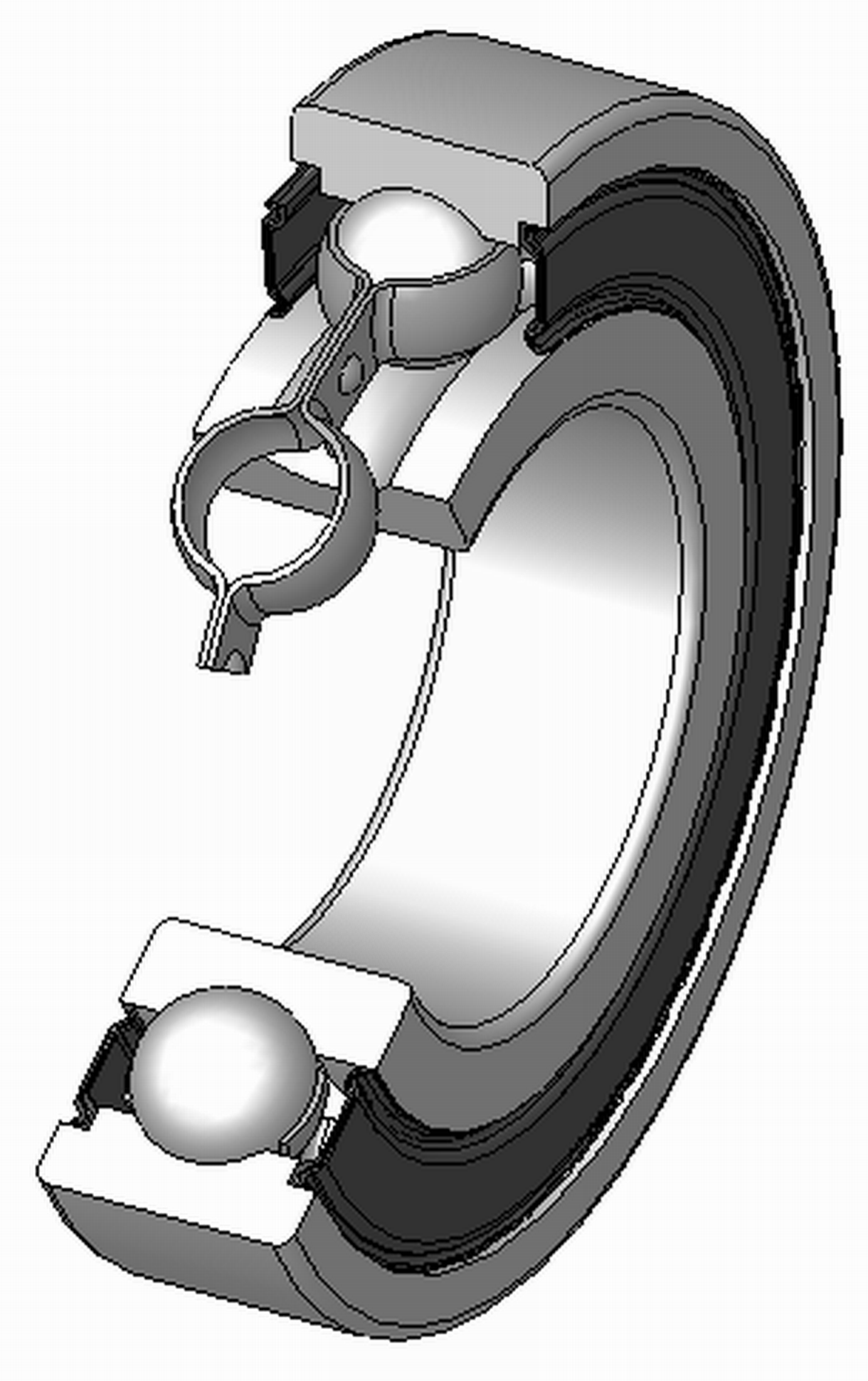
A sealed deep groove ball bearing

In mechanical engineering, a rolling-element bearing, also known as a rolling bearing, is a bearing which carries a load by placing rolling elements (such as balls, cylinders, or cones) between two concentric, grooved rings called races. The relative motion of the races causes the rolling elements to roll with very little rolling resistance and with little sliding.

One of the earliest and best-known rolling-element bearings is a set of logs laid on the ground with a large stone block on top. As the stone is pulled, the logs roll along the ground with little sliding friction. As each log comes out the back, it is moved to the front where the block then rolls onto it. It is possible to imitate such a bearing by placing several pens or pencils on a table and placing an item on top of them. See "bearings" for more on the historical development of bearings.

A rolling element rotary bearing uses a shaft in a much larger hole, and spheres or cylinders called "rollers" tightly fill the space between the shaft and the hole. As the shaft turns, each roller acts as the logs in the above example. However, since the bearing is round, the rollers never fall out from under the load.

Rolling-element bearings have the advantage of a good trade-off between cost, size, weight, carrying capacity, durability, accuracy, friction, and so on. Other bearing designs are often better on one specific attribute, but worse in most other attributes, although fluid bearings can sometimes simultaneously outperform on carrying capacity, durability, accuracy, friction, rotation rate and sometimes cost. Only plain bearings are used as widely as rolling-element bearings. They are commonly used in automotive, industrial, marine, and aerospace applications. They are products of great necessity for modern technology. The rolling element bearing was developed from a firm foundation that was built over thousands of years. The concept emerged in its primitive form in Roman times. After a long inactive period in the Middle Ages, it was revived during the Renaissance by Leonardo da Vinci, and developed steadily in the seventeenth and eighteenth centuries.

== History of bearings timeline ==
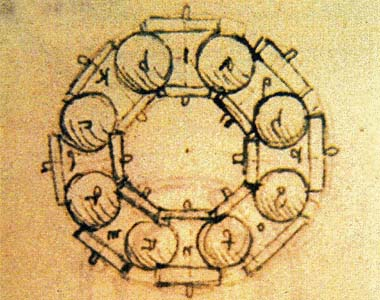
Study of ball bearing by Leonardo da Vinci (1452–1519)

- Beginning in 2600 BCE - The Ancient Egyptians were the first to notably use the concept behind rolling bearings, they first did this by using logs under these stones with groups of builders on either side to push and pull the weight of the stones.
- 40 BC - In the remains of a sunken Roman Ship in Lake Nemi. This discovery shows the continual development of the principle. The remains of the ship do not show clear signs of an indication of what these bearings were used for.
- 17th century - Galileo describes the functionality of a caged bearing
- 1740 - John Harrison invented the first caged roller bearing for H3 marine timekeeping.
- 1794 - The first patent for the ball race was given to Philip Vaughan of Carmarthen, Wales. This is the first design seen with a spherical object moving through a groove.
- 1869 - Jules Suriray receives the first patent for a radial ball bearing, his design was used by James Moore to win the first 80 mi (130 km) bicycle race from Paris to Rouen.

== Overall design ==
Design description

Bearings, especially rolling element bearings, are designed in a similar fashion across the board consisting of the outer and inner track, a central bore, a retainer to keep the rolling elements from clashing into one another or seizing the bearing movement, and the rolling elements themselves.

The internal rolling components may differ in design due to their intended purpose of application of the bearing. The main five types of bearings are ball, cylindrical, tapered, barrel, and needle.

Ball - the simplest following the basic principles with minimal design intention. Important to note the ability for more seizures is likely due to the freedom of the track design.

Cylindrical - For single axis movement for straight directional movement. The shape allows for more surface area to be in contact adding in moving more weight with less force at a greater distance.

Tapered - Primarily focused on the ability to take on axial loading and radial loading. It does this by using a conical structure enabling the elements to roll diagonally.

Barrel - Provides assistance to high radial shock loads that cause misalignment and uses its shape and size for compensation.

Needle - Varying in size, diameters, and materials these types of bearings are best suited for helping reduce weight as well as smaller cross sections application, typically higher load capacity than ball bearings and rigid shaft applications.

== Specific design types ==
=== Ball bearing ===
A particularly common kind of rolling-element bearing is the ball bearing. The bearing has inner and outer races between which balls roll. Each race features a groove usually shaped so the ball fits slightly loose. Thus, in principle, the ball contacts each race across a very narrow area. However, a load on an infinitely small point would cause infinitely high contact pressure. In practice, the ball deforms (flattens) slightly where it contacts each race much as a tire flattens where it contacts the road. The race also yields slightly where each ball presses against it. Thus, the contact between ball and race is of finite size and has finite pressure. The deformed ball and race do not roll entirely smoothly because different parts of the ball are moving at different speeds as it rolls. Thus, there are opposing forces and sliding motions at each ball–race contact. Overall, these cause bearing drag.

=== Roller bearings ===
Load distribution (normal force per roller) in a cylindrical roller bearing of type NU206. The inner ring and rollers of the bearing rotate counterclockwise; a static radial load of 3,000 N acts on the inner ring in the downward direction. The bearing has 13 rollers, 4 of which are under load at any time.

==== Cylindrical roller ====
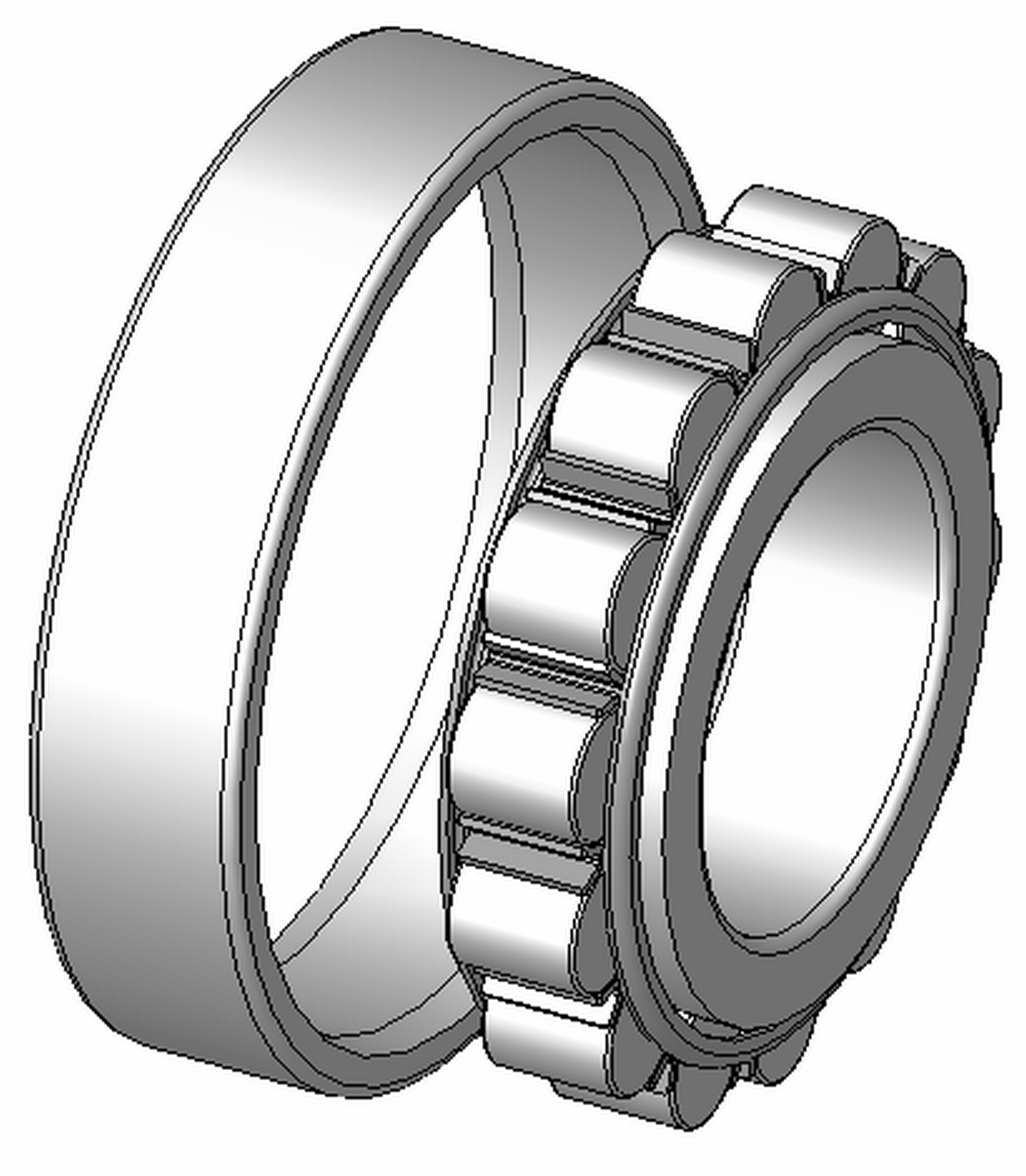
A cylindrical roller bearing

Roller bearings are the earliest known type of rolling-element-bearing, dating back to at least 40 BC. Common roller bearings use cylinders of slightly greater length than diameter. Roller bearings typically have a higher radial load capacity than ball bearings, but a lower capacity and higher friction under axial loads. If the inner and outer races are misaligned, the bearing capacity often drops quickly compared to either a ball bearing or a spherical roller bearing.

As in all radial bearings, the outer load is continuously re-distributed among the rollers. Often fewer than half of the total number of rollers carry a significant portion of the load. The animation on the right shows how a static radial load is supported by the bearing rollers as the inner ring rotates.

==== Spherical roller ====
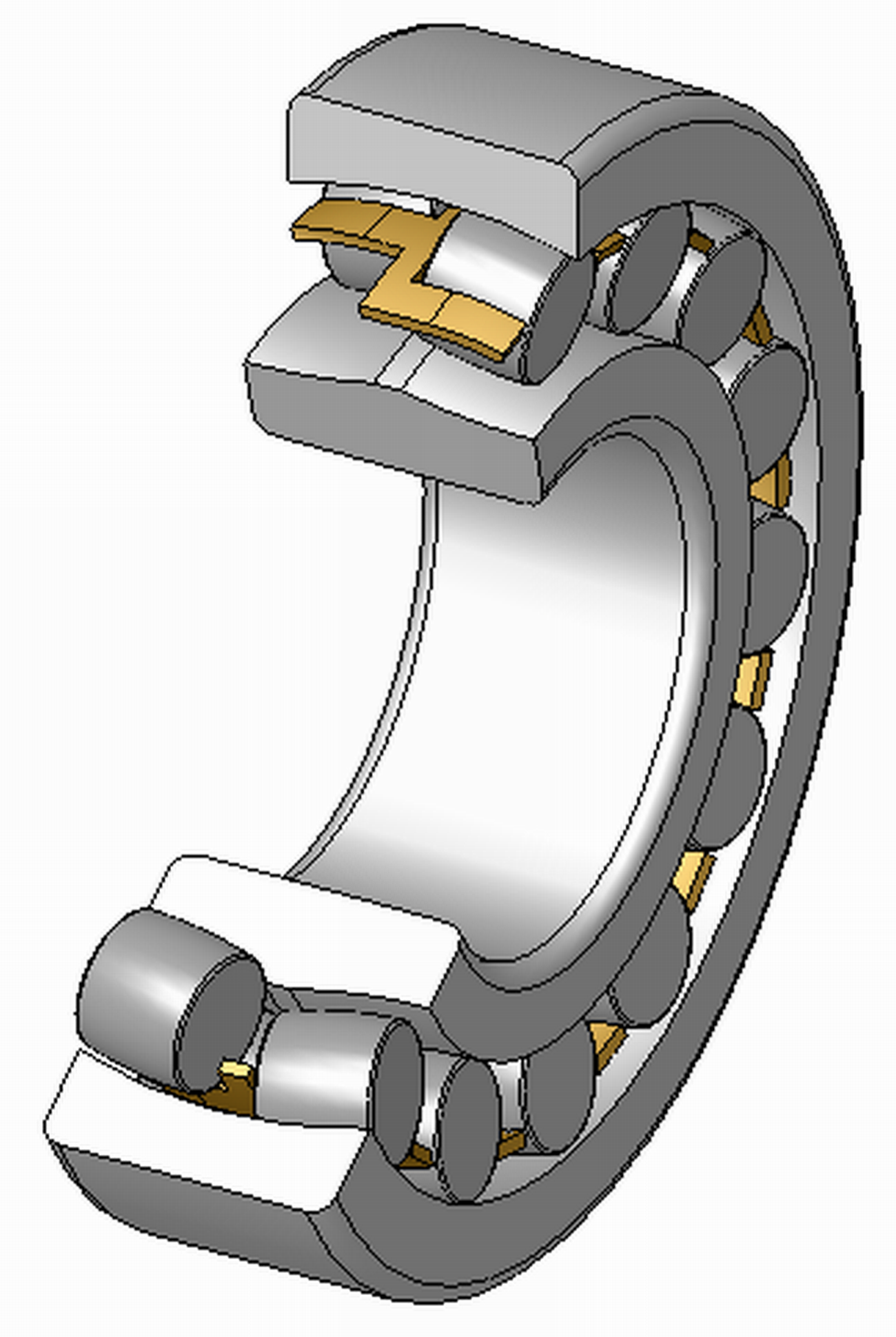
A spherical roller bearing

Spherical roller bearings have an outer race with an internal spherical shape. The rollers are thicker in the middle and thinner at the ends. Spherical roller bearings can thus accommodate both static and dynamic misalignment. However, spherical rollers are difficult to produce and thus expensive, and the bearings have higher friction than an ideal cylindrical or tapered roller bearing since there will be a certain amount of sliding between rolling elements and races.

==== Gear bearing ====
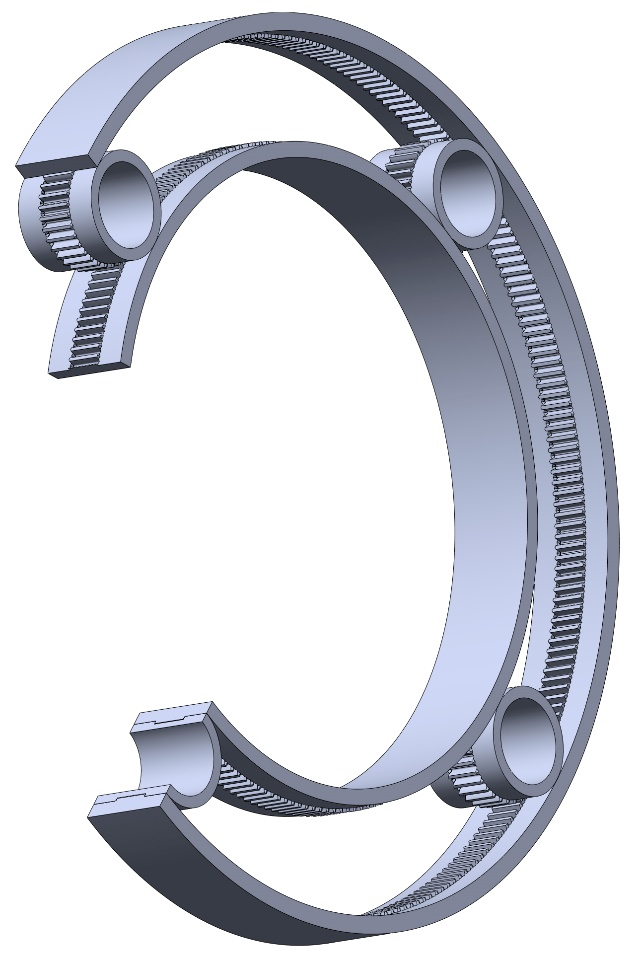
A gear bearing

Gear bearings are similar to epicyclic gearing. They consist of a number of smaller 'satellite' gears which revolve around the center of the bearing along a track on the outsides of the internal and satellite gears, and on the inside of the external gear. The downside to this bearing is manufacturing complexity.

==== Tapered roller ====
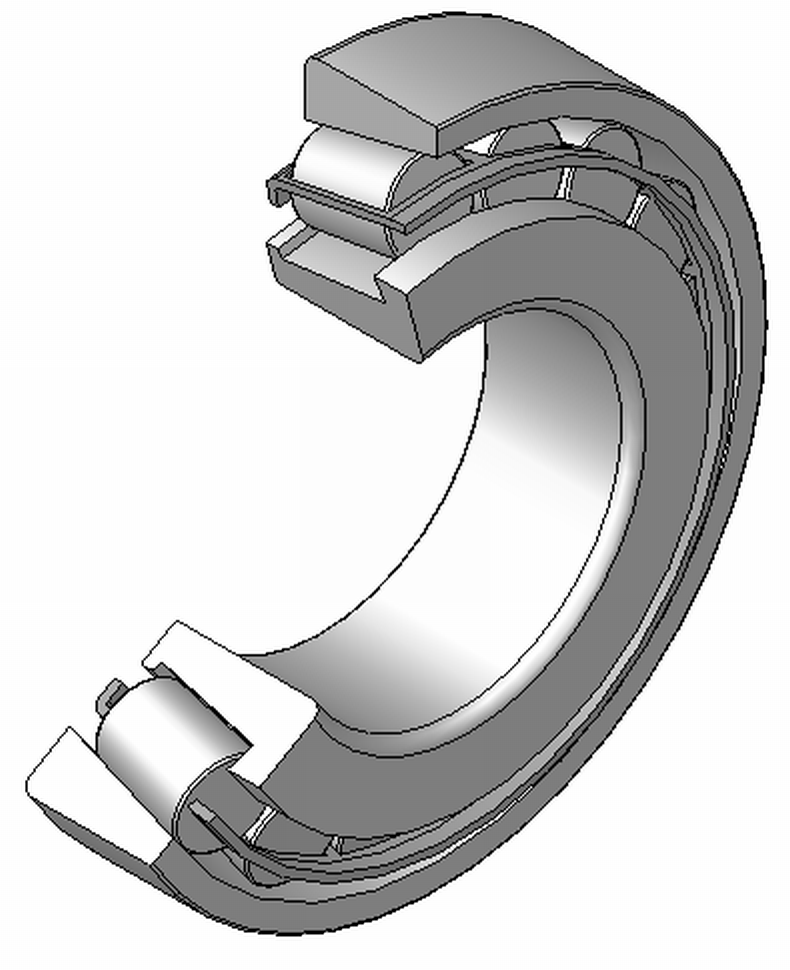
A tapered roller bearing

Tapered roller bearings use conical rollers that run on conical races. Most roller bearings only take radial or axial loads, but tapered roller bearings support both radial and axial loads, and generally can carry higher loads than ball bearings due to greater contact area. Tapered roller bearings are used, for example, as the wheel bearings of most wheeled land vehicles. The downsides to this bearing is that due to manufacturing complexities, tapered roller bearings are usually more expensive than ball bearings; and additionally under heavy loads the tapered roller is like a wedge and bearing loads tend to try to eject the roller; the force from the collar which keeps the roller in the bearing adds to bearing friction compared to ball bearings.

==== Needle roller ====
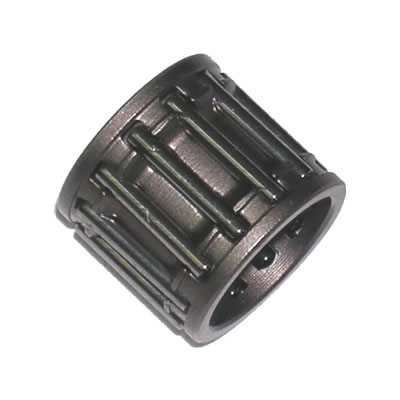
A needle roller bearing

The needle roller bearing is a special type of roller bearing which uses long, thin cylindrical rollers resembling needles. Often the ends of the rollers taper to points, and these are used to keep the rollers captive, or they may be hemispherical and not captive but held by the shaft itself or a similar arrangement. Since the rollers are thin, the outside diameter of the bearing is only slightly larger than the hole in the middle. However, the small-diameter rollers must bend sharply where they contact the races, and thus the bearing fatigues relatively quickly.

==== CARB toroidal roller bearings ====
CARB bearings are toroidal roller bearings and similar to spherical roller bearings, but can accommodate both angular misalignment and also axial displacement. Compared to a spherical roller bearing, their radius of curvature is longer than a spherical radius would be, making them an intermediate form between spherical and cylindrical rollers. Their limitation is that, like a cylindrical roller, they do not locate axially. CARB bearings are typically used in pairs with a locating bearing, such as a spherical roller bearing. This non-locating bearing can be an advantage, as it can be used to allow a shaft and a housing to undergo thermal expansion independently.

Toroidal roller bearings were introduced in 1995 by SKF as "CARB bearings". The inventor behind the bearing was the engineer Magnus Kellström.

== Configurations ==
The configuration of the races determine the types of motions and loads that a bearing can best support. A given configuration can serve multiple of the following types of loading.

=== Thrust loadings ===
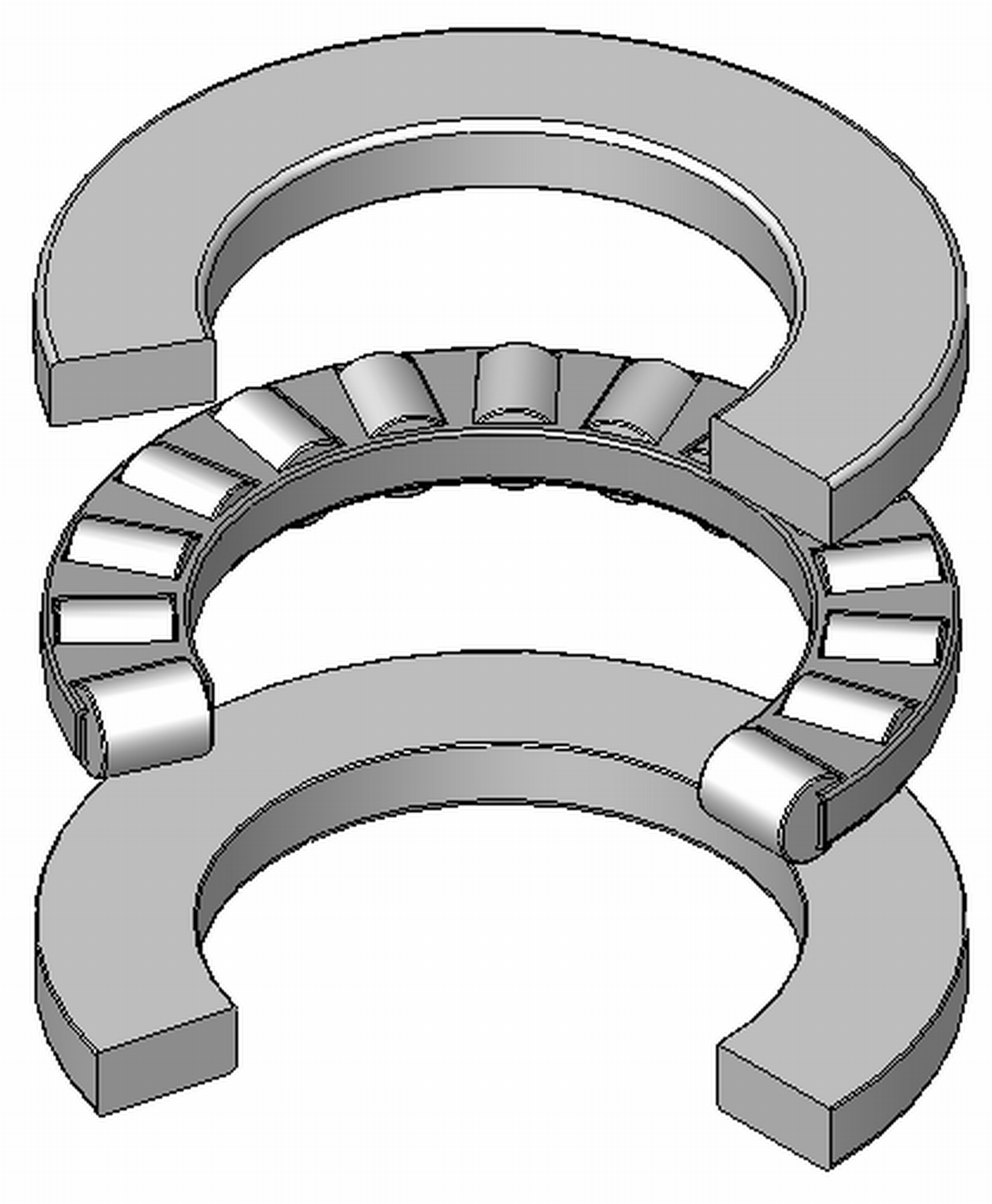
A thrust roller bearing

Thrust bearings are used to support axial loads, such as vertical shafts. Common designs are Thrust ball bearings, spherical roller thrust bearings, tapered roller thrust bearings or cylindrical roller thrust bearings. Also non-rolling-element bearings such as hydrostatic or magnetic bearings see some use where particularly heavy loads or low friction is needed.

=== Radial loadings ===
Rolling-element bearings are often used for axles due to their low rolling friction. For light loads, such as bicycles, ball bearings are often used. For heavy loads and where the loads can greatly change during cornering, such as cars and trucks, tapered rolling bearings are used.

=== Linear motion ===
Linear motion roller-element bearings are typically designed for either shafts or flat surfaces. Flat surface bearings often consist of rollers and are mounted in a cage, which is then placed between the two flat surfaces; a common example is drawer-support hardware. Roller-element bearing for a shaft use bearing balls in a groove designed to recirculate them from one end to the other as the bearing moves; as such, they are called linear ball bearings or recirculating bearings.

== Bearing failure ==
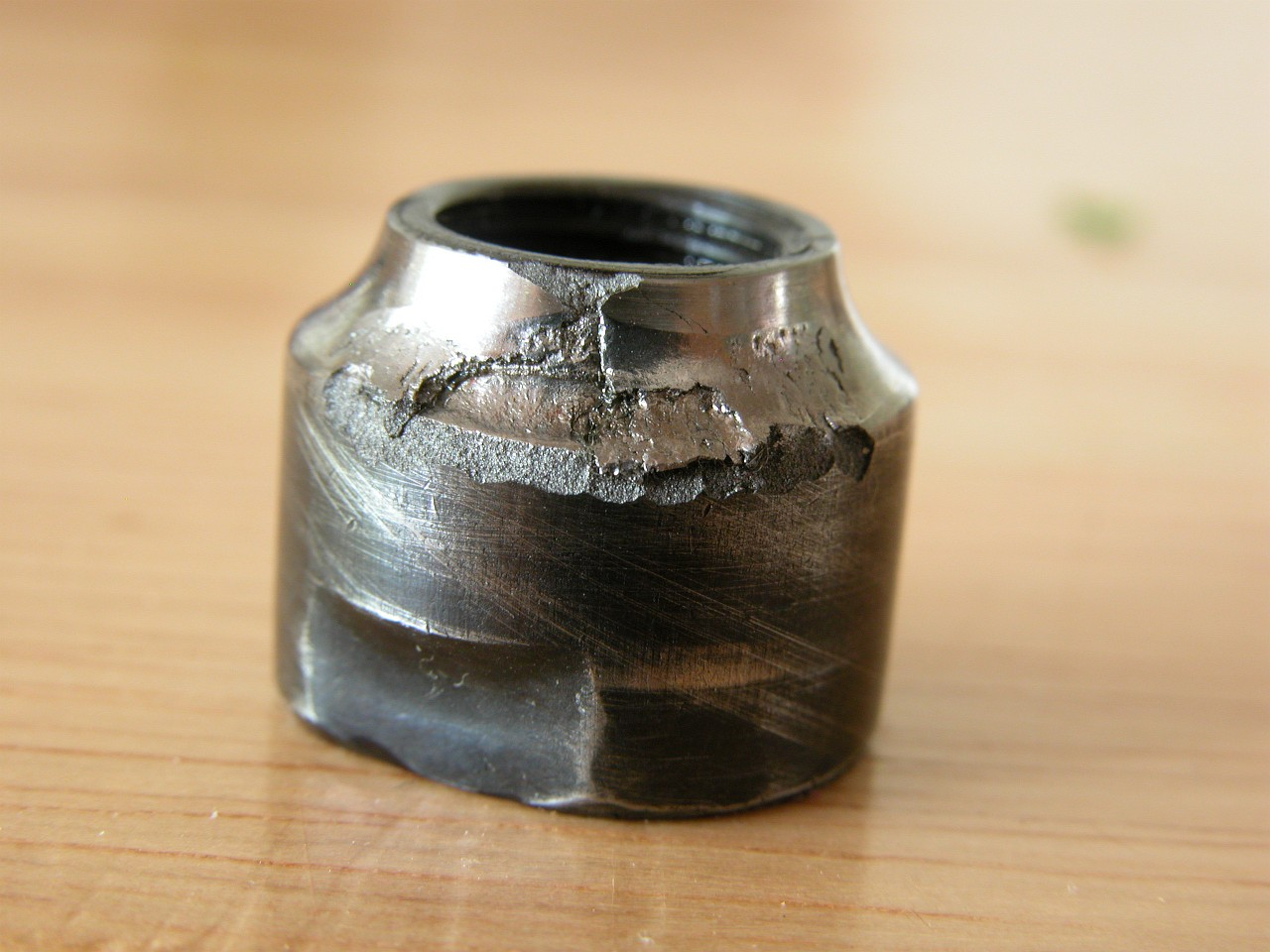
A prematurely failed rear bearing cone from a mountain bicycle, caused by a combination of pitting due to wet conditions, improper lubrication, improper pre-load adjustment, and fatigue from frequent shock loading.

Rolling-element bearings often work well in non-ideal conditions, but sometimes minor problems cause bearings to fail quickly and mysteriously. For example, with a stationary (non-rotating) load, small vibrations can gradually press out the lubricant between the races and rollers or balls (false brinelling). Without lubricant the bearing fails, even though it is not rotating and thus is apparently not being used. For these sorts of reasons, much of bearing design is about failure analysis. Vibration based analysis can be used for fault identification of bearings.

There are three usual limits to the lifetime or load capacity of a bearing: abrasion, fatigue and pressure-induced welding.

- Abrasion occurs when the surface is eroded by hard contaminants scraping at the bearing materials.
- Fatigue results when a material becomes brittle after being repeatedly loaded and released. Where the ball or roller touches the race there is always some deformation, and hence a risk of fatigue. Smaller balls or rollers deform more sharply, and so tend to fatigue faster.
- Pressure-induced welding can occur when two metal pieces are pressed together at very high pressure and they become one. Although balls, rollers and races may look smooth, they are microscopically rough. Thus, there are high-pressure spots which push away the bearing lubricant. Sometimes, the resulting metal-to-metal contact welds a microscopic part of the ball or roller to the race. As the bearing continues to rotate, the weld is then torn apart, but it may leave race welded to bearing or bearing welded to race.

Although there are many other apparent causes of bearing failure, most can be reduced to these three. For example, a bearing which is run dry of lubricant fails not because it is "without lubricant", but because lack of lubrication leads to fatigue and welding, and the resulting wear debris can cause abrasion. Similar events occur in false brinelling damage. In high speed applications, the oil flow also reduces the bearing metal temperature by convection. The oil becomes the heat sink for the friction losses generated by the bearing.

ISO has categorised bearing failures into a document Numbered ISO 15243.

=== Life calculation models ===
The life of a rolling bearing is expressed as the number of revolutions or the number of operating hours at a given speed that the bearing is capable of enduring before the first sign of metal fatigue (also known as spalling) occurs on the race of the inner or outer ring, or on a rolling element. Calculating the endurance life of bearings is possible with the help of so-called life models. More specifically, life models are used to determine the bearing size – since this must be sufficient to ensure that the bearing is strong enough to deliver the required life under certain defined operating conditions.

Under controlled laboratory conditions, however, seemingly identical bearings operating under identical conditions can have different individual endurance lives. Thus, bearing life cannot be calculated based on specific bearings, but is instead related to in statistical terms, referring to populations of bearings. All information with regard to load ratings is then based on the life that 90% of a sufficiently large group of apparently identical bearings can be expected to attain or exceed. This gives a clearer definition of the concept of bearing life, which is essential to calculate the correct bearing size. Life models can thus help to predict the performance of a bearing more realistically.

The prediction of bearing life is described in ISO 281 and the ANSI/American Bearing Manufacturers Association Standards 9 and 11.

The traditional life prediction model for rolling-element bearings uses the basic life equation:

$$L_{10} = (C/P)^p$$

Where:

- $L_{10}$ is the 'basic life' (usually quoted in millions of revolutions) for a reliability of 90%, i.e. no more than 10% of bearings are expected to have failed
- $C$ is the dynamic load rating of the bearing, quoted by the manufacturer
- $P$ is the equivalent dynamic load applied to the bearing
- $p$ is a constant: 3 for ball bearings, 4 for pure line contact and 3.33 for roller bearings

Basic life or $L_{10}$ is the life that 90% of bearings can be expected to reach or exceed. The median or average life, sometimes called Mean Time Between Failure (MTBF), is about five times the calculated basic rating life. Several factors, the 'ASME five factor model', can be used to further adjust the $L_{10}$ life depending upon the desired reliability, lubrication, contamination, etc.

The major implication of this model is that bearing life is finite, and reduces by a cube power of the ratio between design load and applied load. This model was developed in 1924, 1947 and 1952 work by Arvid Palmgren and Gustaf Lundberg in their paper Dynamic Capacity of Rolling Bearings. The model dates from 1924, the values of the constant $p$ from the post-war works. Higher $p$ values may be seen as both a longer lifetime for a correctly used bearing below its design load, or also as the increased rate by which lifetime is shortened when overloaded.

This model was recognised to have become inaccurate for modern bearings. Particularly owing to improvements in the quality of bearing steels, the mechanisms for how failures develop in the 1924 model are no longer as significant. By the 1990s, real bearings were found to give service lives up to 14 times longer than those predicted. An explanation was put forward based on fatigue life; if the bearing was loaded to never exceed the fatigue strength, then the Lundberg-Palmgren mechanism for failure by fatigue would simply never occur. This relied on homogeneous vacuum-melted steels, such as AISI 52100, that avoided the internal inclusions that had previously acted as stress risers within the rolling elements, and also on smoother finishes to bearing tracks that avoided impact loads. The $p$ constant now had values of 4 for ball and 5 for roller bearings. Provided that load limits were observed, the idea of a 'fatigue limit' entered bearing lifetime calculations. If the bearing was not loaded beyond this limit, its theoretical lifetime would be limited only by external factors, such as contamination or a failure of lubrication.

A new model of bearing life was put forward by FAG and developed by SKF as the Ioannides-Harris model. ISO 281:2000 first incorporated this model and ISO 281:2007 is based on it.

The concept of fatigue limit, and thus ISO 281:2007, remains controversial, at least in the US.

=== Generalized Bearing Life Model (GBLM) ===
In 2015, the SKF Generalized Bearing Life Model (GBLM) was introduced. In contrast to previous life models, GBLM explicitly separates surface and subsurface failure modes, making the model flexible to accommodate several different failure modes. Modern bearings and applications show fewer failures, but the failures that do occur are more linked to surface stresses. By separating surface from the subsurface, mitigating mechanisms can more easily be identified. GBLM makes use of advanced tribology models to introduce a surface distress failure mode function, obtained from the evaluation of surface fatigue. For the subsurface fatigue, GBLM uses the classical Hertzian rolling contact model. With all this, GBLM includes the effects of lubrication, contamination, and race surface properties, which together influence the stress distribution in the rolling contact.

In 2019, the Generalized Bearing Life Model was relaunched. The updated model offers life calculations also for hybrid bearings, i.e. bearings with steel rings and ceramic (silicon nitride) rolling elements. Even if the 2019 GBLM release was primarily developed to realistically determine the working life of hybrid bearings, the concept can also be used for other products and failure modes.

== Constraints and trade-offs ==
All parts of a bearing are subject to many design constraints. For example, the inner and outer races are often complex shapes, making them difficult to manufacture. Balls and rollers, though simpler in shape, are small; since they bend sharply where they run on the races, the bearings are prone to fatigue. The loads within a bearing assembly are also affected by the speed of operation: rolling-element bearings may spin over 100,000 rpm, and the principal load in such a bearing may be momentum rather than the applied load. Smaller rolling elements are lighter and thus have less momentum, but smaller elements also bend more sharply where they contact the race, causing them to fail more rapidly from fatigue. Maximum rolling-element bearing speeds are often specified in 'nD_{m}', which is the product of the mean diameter (in mm) and the maximum RPM. For angular contact bearings nD_{m}s over 2.1 million have been found to be reliable in high performance rocketry applications.

There are also many material issues: a harder material may be more durable against abrasion but more likely to suffer fatigue fracture, so the material varies with the application, and while steel is most common for rolling-element bearings, plastics, glass, and ceramics are all in common use. A small defect (irregularity) in the material is often responsible for bearing failure; one of the biggest improvements in the life of common bearings during the second half of the 20th century was the use of more homogeneous materials, rather than better materials or lubricants (though both were also significant). Lubricant properties vary with temperature and load, so the best lubricant varies with application.

Although bearings tend to wear out with use, designers can make tradeoffs of bearing size and cost versus lifetime. A bearing can last indefinitely—longer than the rest of the machine—if it is kept cool, clean, lubricated, is run within the rated load, and if the bearing materials are sufficiently free of microscopic defects. Cooling, lubrication, and sealing are thus important parts of the bearing design.

The needed bearing lifetime also varies with the application. For example, Tedric A. Harris reports in his Rolling Bearing Analysis on an oxygen pump bearing in the U.S. Space Shuttle which could not be adequately isolated from the liquid oxygen being pumped. All lubricants reacted with the oxygen, leading to fires and other failures. The solution was to lubricate the bearing with the oxygen. Although liquid oxygen is a poor lubricant, it was adequate, since the service life of the pump was just a few hours.

The operating environment and service needs are also important design considerations. Some bearing assemblies require routine addition of lubricants, while others are factory sealed, requiring no further maintenance for the life of the mechanical assembly. Although seals are appealing, they increase friction, and in a permanently sealed bearing the lubricant may become contaminated by hard particles, such as steel chips from the race or bearing, sand, or grit that gets past the seal. Contamination in the lubricant is abrasive and greatly reduces the operating life of the bearing assembly. Another major cause of bearing failure is the presence of water in the lubrication oil. Online water-in-oil monitors have been introduced in recent years to monitor the effects of both particles and the presence of water in oil and their combined effect.

== Designation ==
Metric rolling-element bearings have alphanumerical designations, defined by ISO 15, to define all of the physical parameters. The main designation is a seven digit number with optional alphanumeric digits before or after to define additional parameters. Here the digits will be defined as: 7654321. Any zeros to the left of the last defined digit are not printed; e.g. a designation of 0007208 is printed 7208.

Digits one and two together are used to define the inner diameter (ID), or bore diameter, of the bearing. For diameters between 20 and 495 mm, inclusive, the designation is multiplied by five to give the ID; e.g. designation 08 is a 40 mm ID. For inner diameters less than 20 the following designations are used: 00 = 10 mm ID, 01 = 12 mm ID, 02 = 15 mm ID, and 03 = 17 mm ID. The third digit defines the "diameter series", which defines the outer diameter (OD). The diameter series, defined in ascending order, is: 0, 8, 9, 1, 7, 2, 3, 4, 5, 6. The fourth digit defines the type of bearing:

1. Ball radial single-row
2. Ball radial spherical double-row
3. Roller radial with short cylindrical rollers
4. Roller radial spherical double-row
5. Roller needle or with long cylindrical rollers
6. Roller radial with spiral rollers
7. Ball radial-thrust single-row
8. Roller tapered
9. Ball thrust, ball thrust-radial
10. Roller thrust or thrust-radial

The fifth and sixth digit define structural modifications to the bearing. For example, on radial thrust bearings the digits define the contact angle, or the presence of seals on any bearing type. The seventh digit defines the "width series", or thickness, of the bearing. The width series, defined from lightest to heaviest, is: 7, 8, 9, 0, 1 (extra light series), 2 (light series), 3 (medium series), 4 (heavy series). The third digit and the seventh digit define the "dimensional series" of the bearing.

There are four optional prefix characters, here defined as A321-XXXXXXX (where the X's are the main designation), which are separated from the main designation with a dash. The first character, A, is the bearing class, which is defined, in ascending order: C, B, A. The class defines extra requirements for vibration, deviations in shape, the rolling surface tolerances, and other parameters that are not defined by a designation character. The second character is the frictional moment (friction), which is defined, in ascending order, by a number 1–9. The third character is the radial clearance, which is normally defined by a number between 0 and 9 (inclusive), in ascending order, however for radial-thrust bearings it is defined by a number between 1 and 3, inclusive. The fourth character is the accuracy ratings, which normally are, in ascending order: 0 (normal), 6X, 6, 5, 4, T, and 2. Ratings 0 and 6 are the most common; ratings 5 and 4 are used in high-speed applications; and rating 2 is used in gyroscopes. For tapered bearings, the values are, in ascending order: 0, N, and X, where 0 is 0, N is "normal", and X is 6X.

There are five optional characters that can defined after the main designation: A, E, P, C, and T; these are tacked directly onto the end of the main designation. Unlike the prefix, not all of the designations must be defined. "A" indicates an increased dynamic load rating. "E" indicates the use of a plastic cage. "P" indicates that heat-resistant steel are used. "C" indicates the type of lubricant used (C1–C28). "T" indicates the degree to which the bearing components have been tempered (T1–T5).

While manufacturers follow ISO 15 for part number designations on some of their products, it is common for them to implement proprietary part number systems that do not correlate to ISO 15.

== See also ==
- Axlebox – Parts list of railroad trucks (bogies)
- Ball bearing – Type of rolling-element bearing
- Bearing (mechanical) – Mechanism to constrain relative movement to the desired motion and reduce friction
- Bearing surface – Area of contact between two objects
- Brinelling – Permanent indentation of a hard surface
- Gear bearing
- Plain bearing – Simplest type of bearing, with no rolling elements
- Spherical roller bearing – Rolling-element bearing that tolerates angular misalignment
