= Boundary friction =

Boundary friction occurs when a surface is at least partially wet, but not so lubricated that there is no direct friction between two surfaces.

== The Effect ==
When two consistent, unlubricated surfaces slide against each other, there is a specific, predictable amount of friction that occurs. This amount increases as velocity does, but only up to a certain point. That increase generally follows what is known as a Stribeck curve, after Richard Stribeck. On the other hand, if the two surfaces are completely lubricated, there is no direct friction or rubbing at all. In real life, though, there is often a situation where the surfaces are not completely dry, but also not so lubricated that they do not touch.

This "boundary friction" produces various effects, like an increase in lubrication through the generation of shearing forces, or an oscillation effect during motion, as the friction increases and decreases.

For example, one can experience vibration when trying to brake on a partially damp road, or a cold glass that is slowly condensing moisture can be lifted until it spontaneously slides across the surface it is resting on.
