= Dunt (disambiguation) =

Dunt is a fault that can occur during the firing of ceramic articles.

Dunt may also refer to:

- Ian Dunt (born 1982), British author, political journalist and broadcaster
- John Dunt, former Royal Navy Vice Admiral
- Fictional South Australian town in We Can Be Heroes: Finding The Australian of the Year
