= Bofors Manor =

Former mansion in Karlskoga, Sweden

- Bofors herrgård
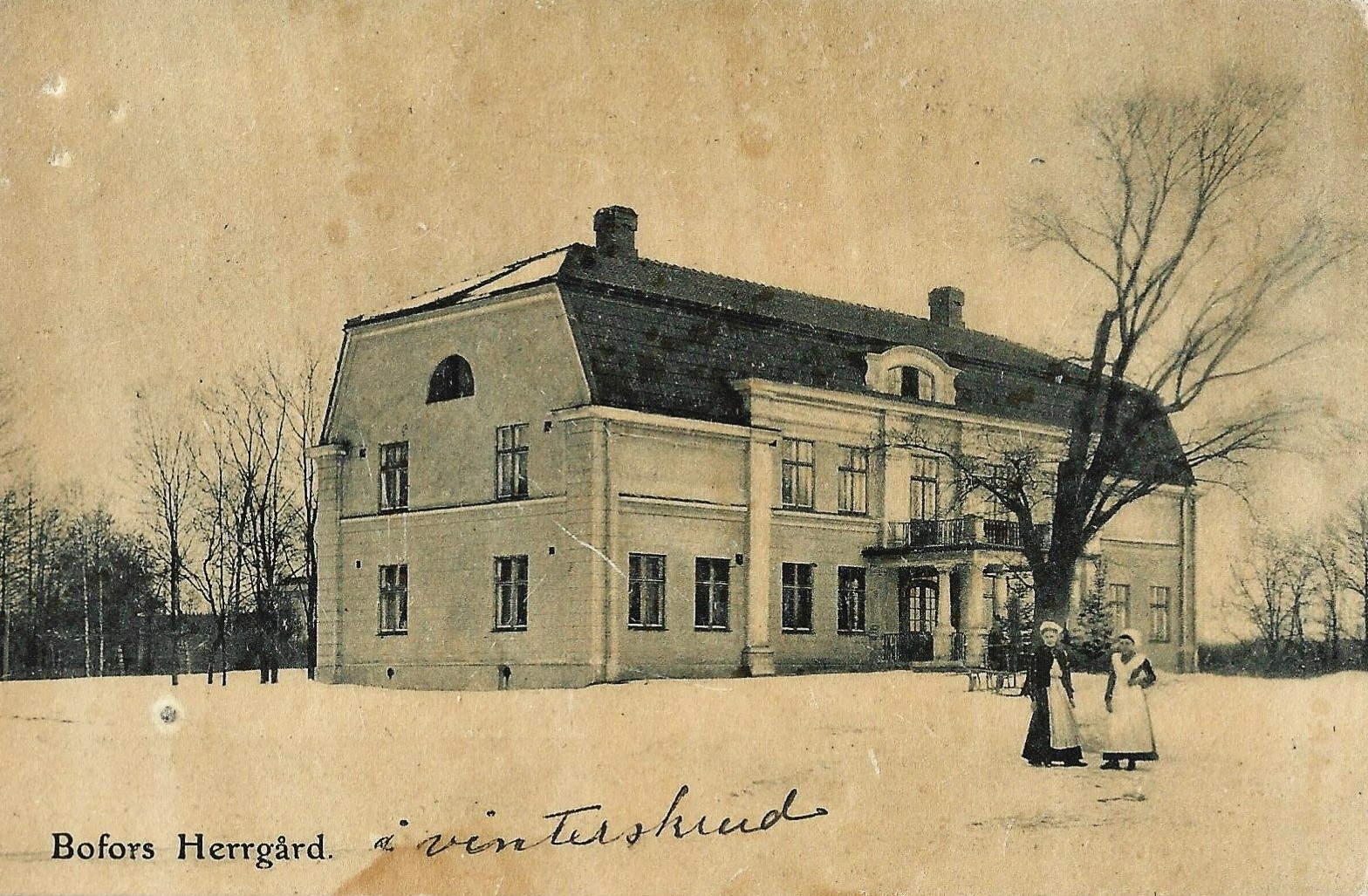
- Bofors Manor in the beginning of the 1900s
- Interactive map of the Bofors Manor area

General information
- Type: Manor house
- Location: Karlskoga, Sweden
- Coordinates: 59.329928°N 14.538258°E
- Construction started: 18th century

Bofors Manor (Swedish: Bofors herrgård) was a manor house in central Karlskoga, Sweden, built at the end of the 18th century.

== Background ==
It was the residence of the works manager Sven Wingquist, who was the last person to live in the mansion. After Wingquist, the mansion ceased to be used as the residence for the manager and was replaced by a new building on Boåsberget.

One notable event took place when Erik Gustaf Geijer sat on a rocky ledge beneath one of the windows of Bofors Manor, capturing the scene as he sketched and painted Bofors Works.
