= SKF =

World's largest bearing manufacturer

Aktiebolaget SKF

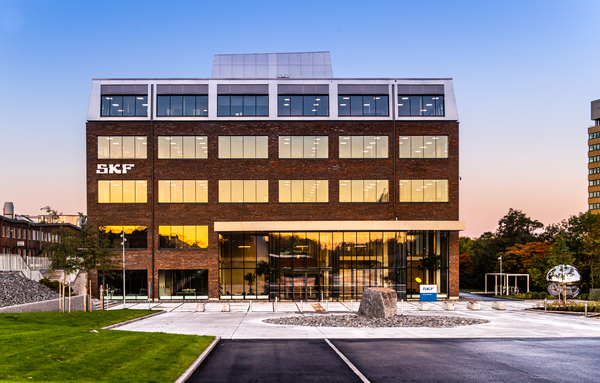
- Headquarters of SKF in Gothenburg, Sweden (2020)
- Type: Publicly traded Aktiebolag
- Traded as: Nasdaq Stockholm: SKF B OMX Stockholm 30
- ISIN: SE0000108201; SE0000108227
- Industry: Manufacturing
- Founded: 1907; 119 years ago
- Founders: Sven Wingquist; Axel Carlander
- Headquarters: Gothenburg, Sweden
- Area served: Worldwide
- Key people: Hans Stråberg (Chairman); Rickard Gustafson (President & CEO)
- Products: Bearings; Seals; Lubrication systems; Maintenance products; Condition Monitoring; Grease
- Revenue: ▲81.73 billion kr (2021)
- Operating income: ▲10.76 billion kr (2021)
- Net income: ▲7.58 billion kr (2021)
- Total assets: ▲99.63 billion kr (2021)
- Total equity: ▲45.37 billion kr (2021)
- Owner: FAM AB (14%; 29.3% votes)
- Number of employees: 42,602 (end 2021)
- Subsidiaries: GLOi; Kaydon Corporation; Blohm + Voss Industries; General Bearing Corp.; Alemite; Lincoln; Reelcraft; +150 other
- Website: skf.com

Aktiebolaget SKF (Swedish: Svenska Kullagerfabriken, 'Swedish Ball Bearing Factory Ltd.') is a Swedish bearing and seal manufacturing company founded in Gothenburg, in 1907. The company manufactures and supplies bearings, seals, lubrication and lubrication systems, maintenance products, mechatronics products, power transmission products, condition monitoring systems and related services globally.

SKF is the world's largest bearing manufacturer and employs 44,000 people in 108 manufacturing units. It has the largest industrial distributor network in the industry, with 17,000 distributor locations encompassing 130 countries. SKF is one of the largest companies in Sweden and among the 2,000 largest public companies in the world.

== History ==
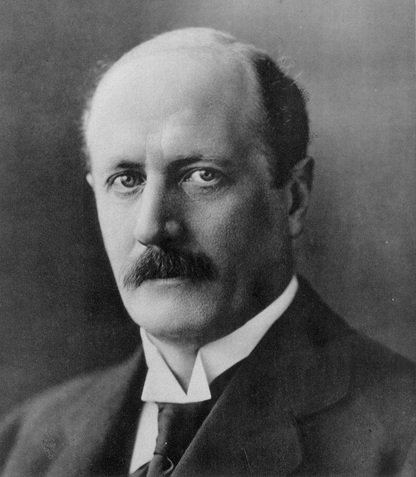
Engineer Sven Wingqvist, co-founder of SKF (1876-1953)

=== Invention of ball and roller bearings ===
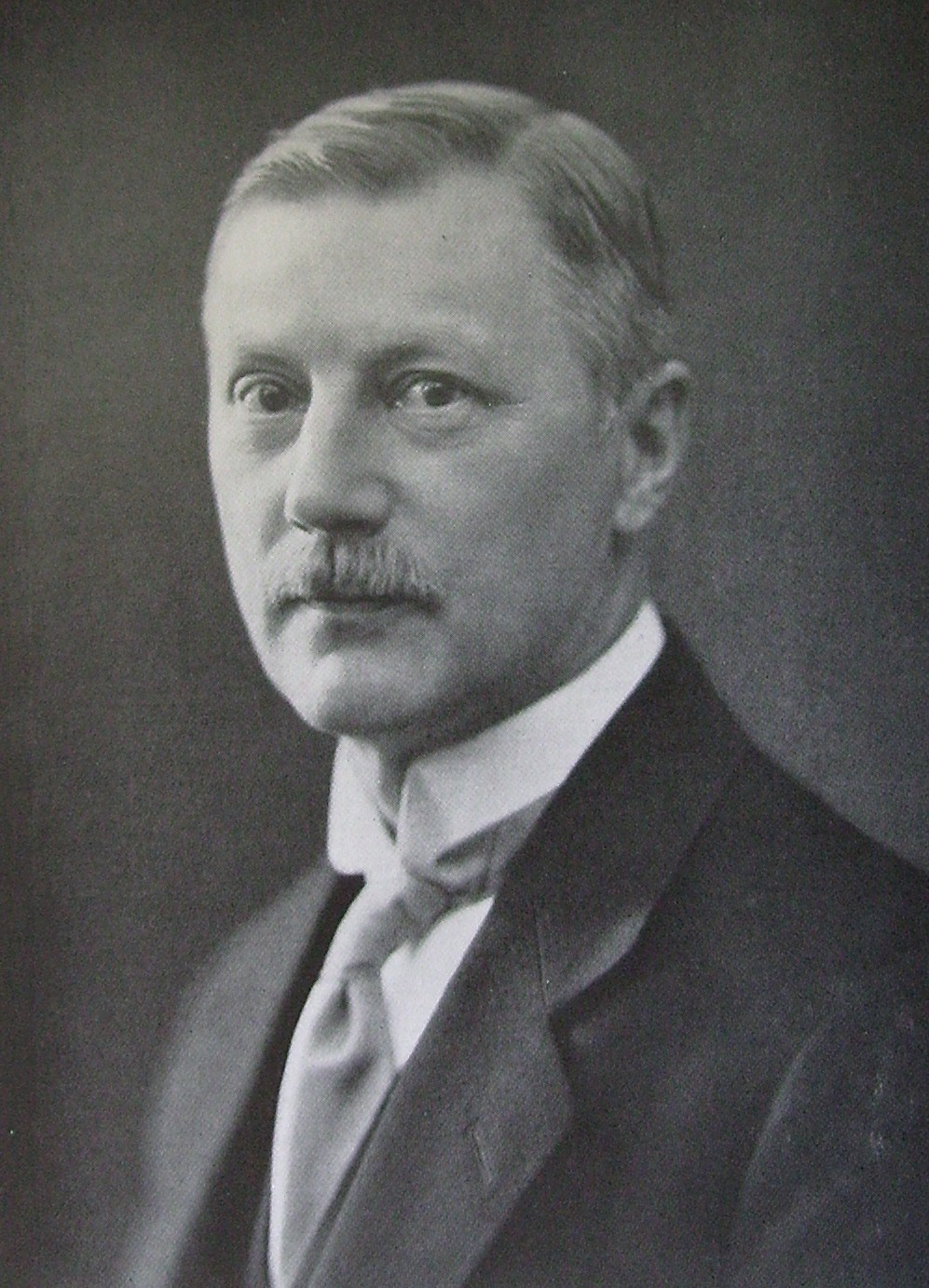
Industrialist Axel Carlander, co-founder of SKF (1869-1939)

AB SKF was established in Gothenburg in 1907 with the initial capital and startup project for ball bearing manufacturing of Gamlestadens Fabriker AB, under the guidance of co-owners and members of the board Axel Carlander and Knut Johansson Mark, following the invention of the spherical ball bearing by engineer Sven Gustaf Wingquist. He was an operations engineer in Gamlestadens Fabriker AB and was then appointed CEO and technical manager in SKF. Industrialist Axel Carlander was the first chairman of the board of SKF from 1907 to 1937 during which time he implemented successful industrial and corporate managerial strategies for the startup and growth of SKF and the establishment of its factories outside Sweden.

Sven Wingqvist, at the time a thirty-year-old plant engineer responsible for repairs and maintenance at Gamlestadens Fabriker, was dissatisfied with the performance of the ball bearings then in use. In spring 1907, Wingquist presented a breakthrough: a double row self-aligning ball bearing with a spherical raceway in the outer ring, shared by both rows of balls. This allowed the inner ring to align freely in relation to the outer ring, with no negative impact on the function of the bearing. The new bearing solved the problem associated with misalignment of the shafts and thus did away with the frequent production stops. Self-alignment was particularly useful in the less-than-perfect machinery of the times and in buildings with subsidence problems, which was the case at Gamlestadens Fabriker, since much of the land on which Gothenburg has been built is clay.

On 16 February 1907, Wingqvist applied for Swedish patent No. 25406, a multi-row self-aligning radial ball bearing. The Patent was granted on 6 June in Sweden coinciding with patents in 10 other countries. The new ball bearing was successful from the outset. Three years after SKF was founded, the company had 325 employees and a subsidiary in the United Kingdom. Manufacturing operations were later established in multiple countries.

In 1906, Sven Wingquist patented the self-aligning ball bearing, and in 1907, the multi-row self-regulating radial ball bearing (spherical ball bearing). He graduated Örebro Technical Elementary School in 1894, whereafter he started working as an engineer in Swedish textile factories, respectively Jonsereds Fabriker AB from 1896 to 1899 and Gamlestadens Fabriker AD from 1899 onwards. As an operations engineer responsible for repairs and maintenance at Gamlestadens Fabriker AD he sought opportunities to improve the efficiency and endurance of the ball bearings used at the time. Due to that, he was interested in a comparative study from 1902 about ball and plain bearings by professor Richard Stribeck of the Institute of Technology in Dresden, Germany. Sven Wingquist invented the first design of combined self-aligning spherical ball bearing. It was a revolutionary upgrade of the first ball bearing design which was invented and patented by Welsh iron-maker Philip Vaughan in 1794 and the first design of self-aligning spherical plain bearing which was invented by Scottish engineer James Nasmyth around 1840. The historical development of the bearing’s design is a result of revolutionary inventions and upgrades for improvement of their efficiency and endurance as well as broadening the scope of their application to a variety of machine industry sectors.

In 1917–1919 Arvid Palmgren, who started working as a research engineer in SKF, invented and patented the first design of the double-row self-aligning roller bearing (spherical roller bearing), the production of which continues to this day. He graduated in civil engineering at KTH Royal Institute of Technology in Stockholm in 1916 and became a Doctor of Technology in 1930 with dissertation thesis on the capacity of ball bearings.

=== Initial growth and expansion ===
The startup and growth of SKF depends not only on technical inventions but also on industrial and corporate management strategies and power. Axel Carlander was a co-founder of SKF as a co-owner and member of the board of Gamlestadens Fabriker AB, which corporate policy provided conditions for experimenting with the new bearing models and the startup of SKF, and also he was the first chairman of the board of SKF who applied successful managerial strategies to the company startup and its development during the first 30 years. He graduated from the Gothenburg Trade Institute in 1886 and he is second generation industrialist with education and significant managerial experience in the field of economics, trade and industry. He developed his industrial and corporate strategies as co-founder and chairmen of the board of leading companies in Gothenburg, as co-owner and board member of the trade and textile company Johansson & Carlander and Gamlestadens Fabriker AB; co-founder and first chairmen of the board of SKF (1907– ); co-founder and first chairman of the board of shipping companies Swedish American Mexico Line ‘SAML’ (1911– ) and Swedish American Line ‘SAL’ (1914– ); board member of Volvo (1917– ); chairman of the City Council (1923– ); co-founder, donor and first chairman of Carlanderska hospital (1927– ), as well as board member of other companies, banks, associations and foundations established for the benefit of business and society. SKF grew as a global company because of his successful industrial and corporate managerial strategies for its startup and growth during the first 30 years - for example in 1930 the company had 12 factories with 21,000 employees, two-thirds outside Sweden.

The main corporate strategies of SKF have always been focused on the development and maintenance of the manufactured bearings and the manufacturing bases. As an exception, in 1917 Volvo was established at SKF to construct an innovative type of car with the implementation of new bearings. In 1926, the subsidiary automobile company Volvo was founded as an engineering project by Assar Gabrielsson, Bjorn Prytz and Gustaf Larson, and separated as an independent company in 1935. With this innovative startup project, SKF once again contributed to the Swedish and global machine industry development.

Axel Carlander was CEO of SKF from 1907 to 1937 and died in 1939. Sven Wingqvist was CEO of SKF from 1938 to 1953. Sven Wingqvist and Marcus Wallenberg were co-founders of Svenska Aeroplane Aktiebolaget (SAAB AB).

By 1912, SKF was represented in 32 countries and by 1930, a staff of over 21,000 were employed in 12 manufacturing facilities worldwide with the largest in Philadelphia, United States.

SKF began its operations in India in 1923 by establishing a trading outpost in Calcutta. The early operations involved the importing of automotive bearings. SKF India Ltd was incorporated in 1961 following a collaboration between AB SKF, Associated Bearing Co. Ltd and Investment Corp. of India Ltd. In 1963, SKF set up its first bearing factory in Pune, Maharashtra.

Assar Gabrielsson, SKF sales manager, and Björn Prytz, Managing Director of SKF, were the founders of Volvo AB in 1926. In the beginning, the company functioned as a subsidiary automobile company within the SKF group. SKF funded the production run of the first thousand cars, built at Hisingen in Gothenburg, beginning in 1927. SKF used one of the company's trademarked names: AB Volvo, which derives from the Latin "I roll", with its obvious connotations of bearings in motion. The ownership of Volvo lasted until 1935, when the last shares were divested.

=== World War II to the present day ===
During the Second World War, Sven Wingvist was CEO of SKF and Jacob Wallenberg was member of the company's board of SKF directors. The Wallenberg-owned ball-bearing multinational, SKF, supplied the German military with ball-bearings and ball-bearing machines, and had a monopoly on it in Europe. SKF also supplied the Allies with ball-bearings. SKF's ball-bearings were Sweden's most important strategic contribution to German war production. In the spring of 1944, the Swedish government, along with the Wallenbergs, promised the Allies that the export of ball-bearings would cease. However, SKF continued to export. When this could not be done legally, the ball-bearings were smuggled to Germany. As late as 1945, SKF sold ball-bearing steel and ball-bearing machines to Hitler. It has been estimated that the supply of ball-bearings prolonged World War II by two years. SKF actively worked to cut off the supply of ball-bearings to the defense industry in the US and instead supplied products from its American factories to Nazi Germany through subsidiaries in South America.

In order to expand its international business, SKF decided in 1966 it needed to use the English language due to its status as the lingua franca of multinational corporations. Senior officials, although mostly still Swedish, all learned English and all major internal documents were in English. In the 1970s SKF embarked on a massive production rationalisation program in Europe. A visionary project, "Production Concept for the 80s" was launched with the aim to run the night shifts practically unmanned. To increase productivity and safeguard the product quality, a continuous, automatic flow of bearing rings was needed, so SKF developed the FlexLink brand. FlexLink created the multiflex plastic chain conveyor system to solve the business requirements. SKF divested FlexLink as a separate company in 1997.

Today, SKF continues to manufacture bearings and related products, including its SKF Explorer and SKF Energy Efficient bearing ranges.

== Present day business ==
=== Products ===
SKF sells products within five technology platforms:

- Bearings and units
- Mechatronics
- Lubrication systems
- Services
- Seals

The SKF Group currently consists of approximately 150 companies, including the seal manufacturer Chicago Rawhide. Since its founding, SKF's company headquarters have been located in Gothenburg. One recent acquisition was that of Economos, part of Salzer Holding, an Austria-based seal company, Jaeger Industrial and ABBA, Taiwanese manufacturers of linear actuators. The company's clients include General Electric, Rolls-Royce plc and Pratt & Whitney. It also supplies bearings for Ferrari racing vehicles, used in Formula One races, and is a sponsor of F1. Then SKF became sponsor of Team Penske in the NASCAR Cup Series since 2012, Then in 2017 SKF became as Brad Keselowski sponsor in #2 Ford Fusion and #22 Ford Mustang in Xfinity Series, Previously, it is Sponsor of Richard Childress Racing, and Roush Fenway Racing, SKF is Sponsor of Ducati Corse in MotoGP since 2015. Another focus area is the energy sector, including wind turbines which generate electricity.

By 2011, SKF Industrial Market, Regional Sales and Services, made up about 40% of SKF's total sales.

In 2021, SKF had a total net sales of 81.73 billion kr.

=== SKF India ===
SKF India, established in 1961, is the company's Indian subsidiary. SKF India is publicly listed on the National Stock Exchange of India and the Bombay Stock Exchange. The company has a large presence in the Indian bearing industry. As of 2021, SKF India has 3 manufacturing facilities and 12 offices across India. SKF India employs 1762 people, more than 1900 suppliers and 455 authorized distributors. In total SKF has a pan India footprint consisting of 6 manufacturing facilities, 3 part of other SKF Units in India.

== Business excellence ==
SKF runs its own business excellence program for continuous improvement (Kaizen) of its business processes in all parts of the company. The program is based on previous initiatives like TQM and integrates with lean management also statistical methods of Six Sigma along with related project management. Many elements of this SKF program remind of the integrated approach of the actual EFQM model for Business Excellence.

The Group has a global certification to ISO 14001 (environmental management system), ISO 50001 (energy management) and OHSAS 18001 (health and safety) standards. Its operations are also certified to either ISO 9001 or applicable customer industry standards, e.g. ISO/TS 16949 (automotive), AS9100 (aviation), or IRIS (railway) for quality management systems.

== See also ==
- List of Swedish companies
- Timken Roller Bearing Company

== Gallery ==
SKF self-aligning ball bearing

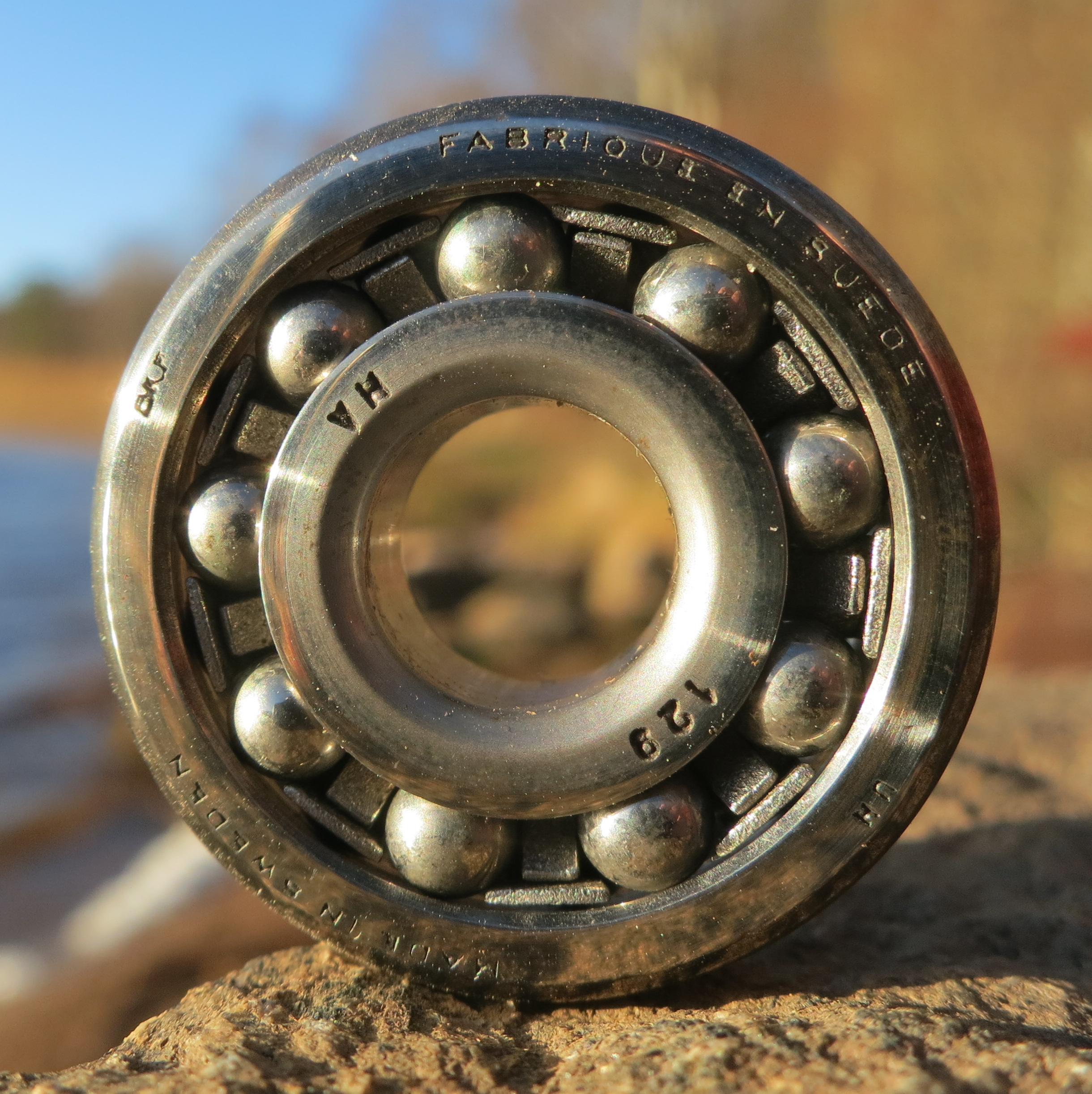
SKF ball bearing from the 1950s

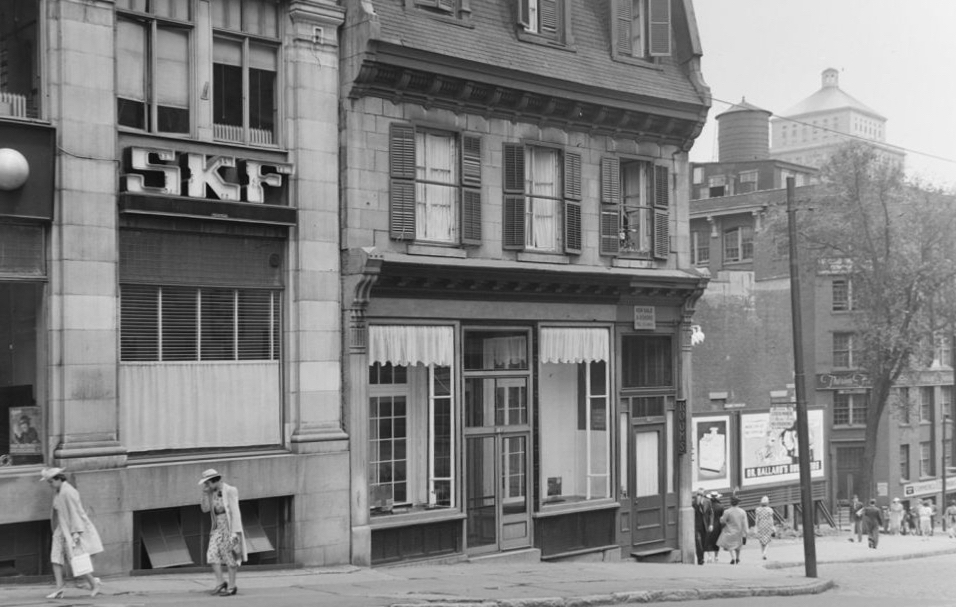
SKF office in Montreal, Quebec, Canada, in 1940

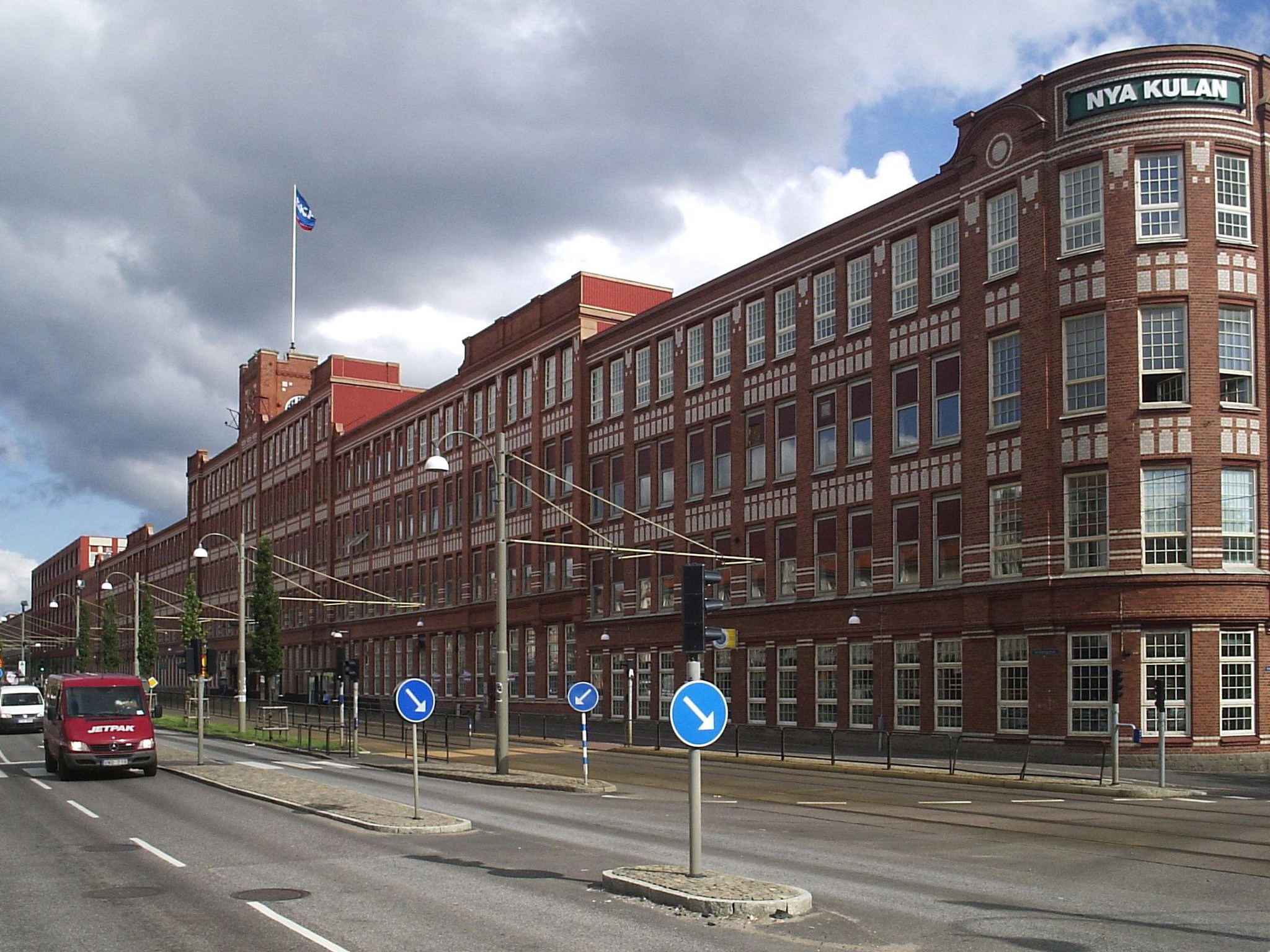
Old SKF buildings in Gothenburg

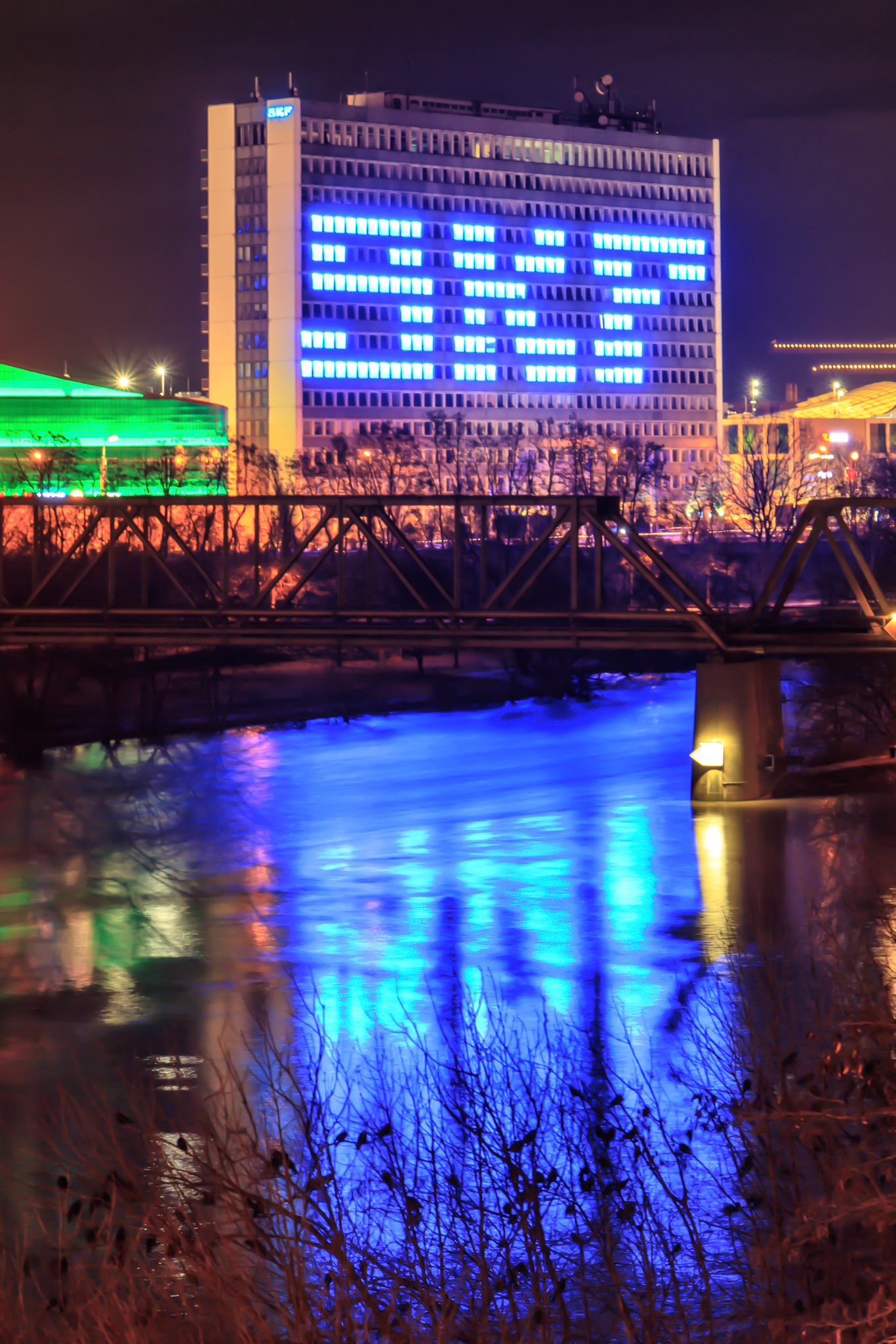
SKF building in Schweinfurt, Germany (2012)

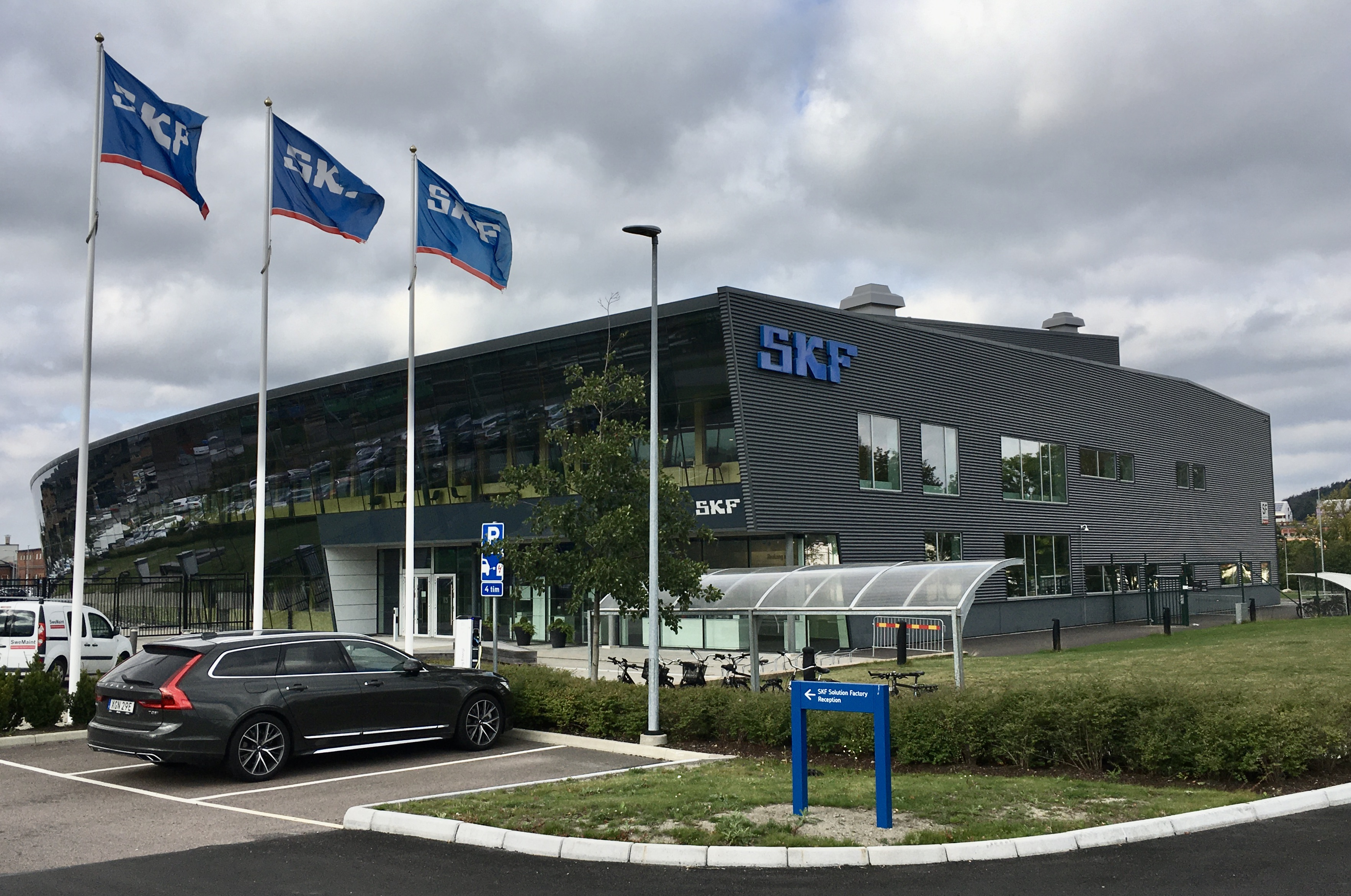
Office of SKF's Swedish sales unit in Gothenburg since August 2020
