= Pottery fracture =

Result of thermal treatment

Pottery fracture results from stress within a ceramic body due to thermal expansion and contraction, shrinkage, and other forces. Poor drying or uneven compression and alignment of particles can result in low strength. Cracking may appear in greenware as well as each stage of the firing including bisqueware and glazed ware.

Fracture in greenware resulting in stresses during the making. To avoid cracks in greenware uniformity should be maintained in the thickness of the pot, the drying of the greenware, as well as consistency of the clay body itself. Cracks can result in uneven drying from thinner to thicker spots within the pot. A lack of compression in the bottom while throwing results in a commonly seen "s" crack on the underneath of the pot.

Fractures caused by thermal shock called dunting occur during the firing process and are witnessed in the bisqueware stage. Dunting is a problem that commonly occurs during the cooling process of the firing cycle. Latent or dormant cracks which went unnoticed in greenware may appear in bisqued ware after firing.

A crack that appears in any stage of firing worsens through multiple firings. Cracks may also go unnoticed until after the glazed firing. In glazed ware the glaze causes stress due to thermal expansion. The interaction of the glaze and the clay body causes stress on the pot in glaze firing.
