= Adolf Martens =

German metallurgist (1850–1914)

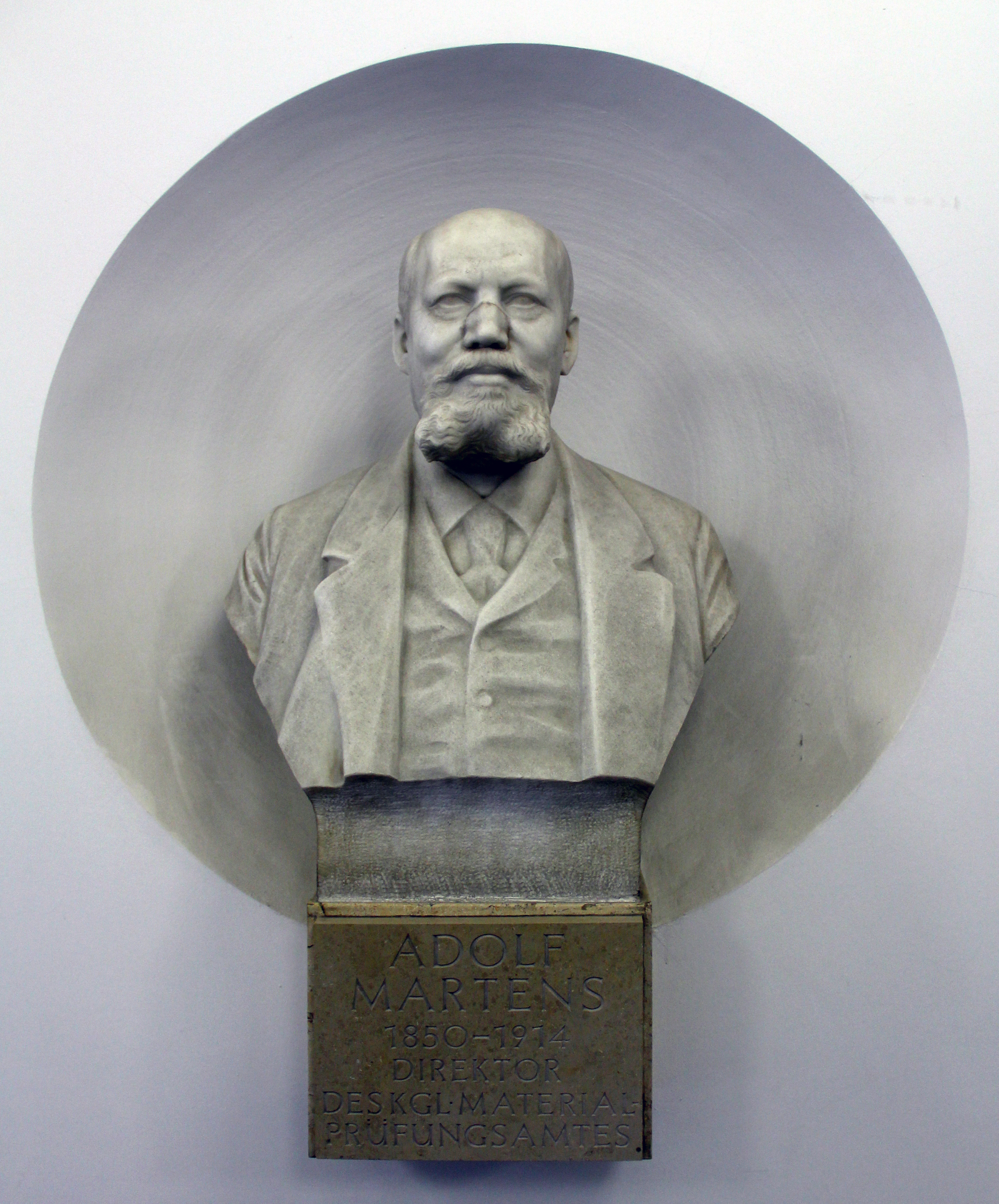
Bust of Adolf Martens in Berlin

Adolf Martens (Adolf Karl Gottfried Martens; 6 March 1850 in Gammelin – 24 July 1914 in Groß-Lichterfelde) was a German metallurgist and the namesake of the steel structure martensite and the martensitic transformation, a type of diffusionless phase transition in the solid state. He also made significant contributions to the field of tribology. The functional relationship between the coefficient of friction and the product of sliding speed and viscosity divided by the normal load (well known as the Stribeck curve) was experimentally explored by Adolf Martens in 1888, long before Richard Stribeck made his pioneering measurements in 1902.
