= Sven Gustaf Wingqvist =

Swedish engineer (1876–1953)

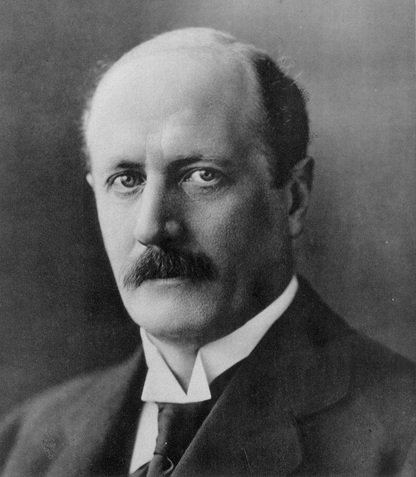
- Sven Gustaf Wingqvist, c. 1926
- Born: 10 December 1876; Kumla Municipality, Örebro, Sweden
- Died: 17 April 1953 (aged 76)
- Occupations: Engineer, inventor, industrialist, co-founder and former CEO of SKF

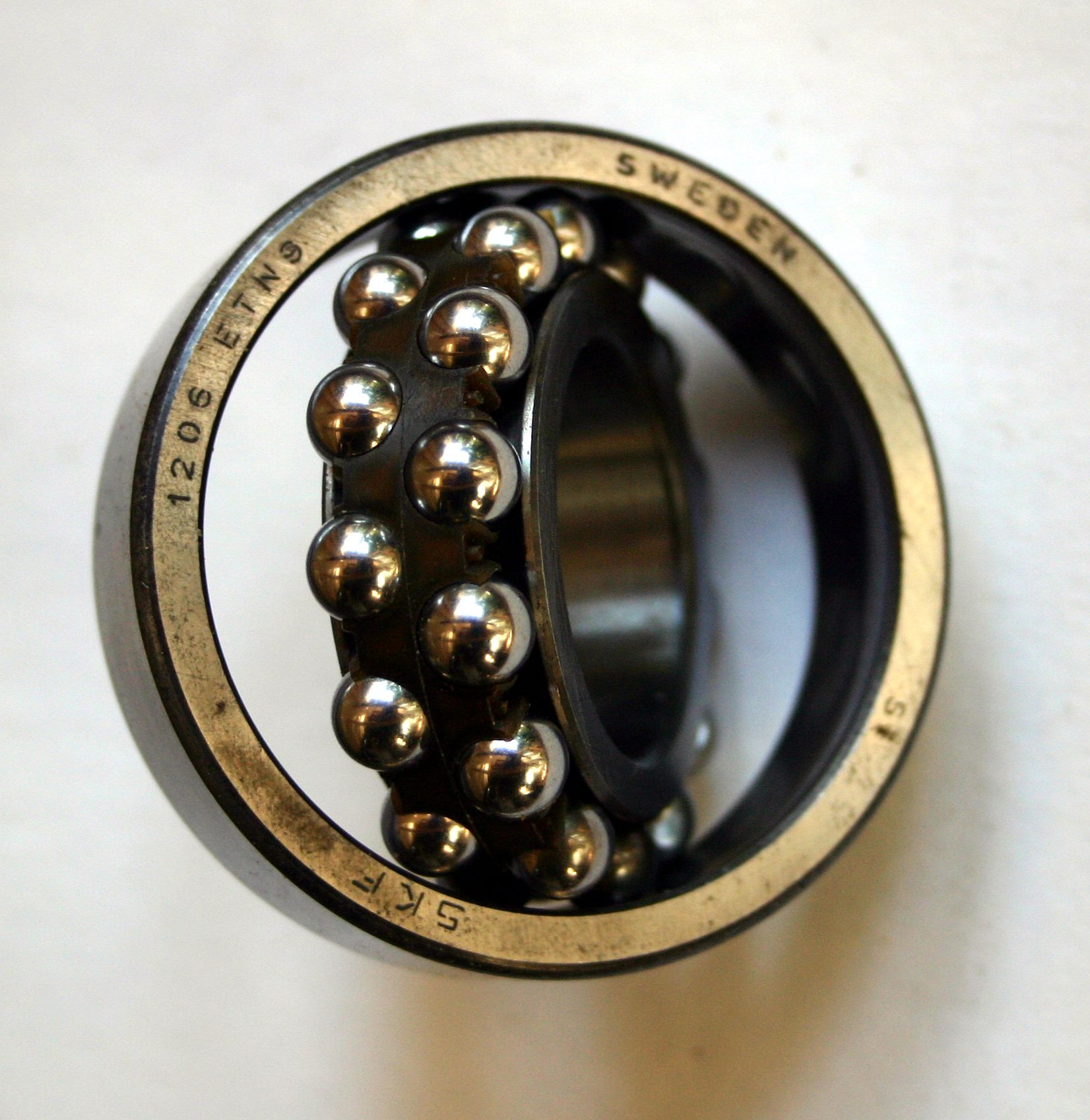
Wingqvist bearing

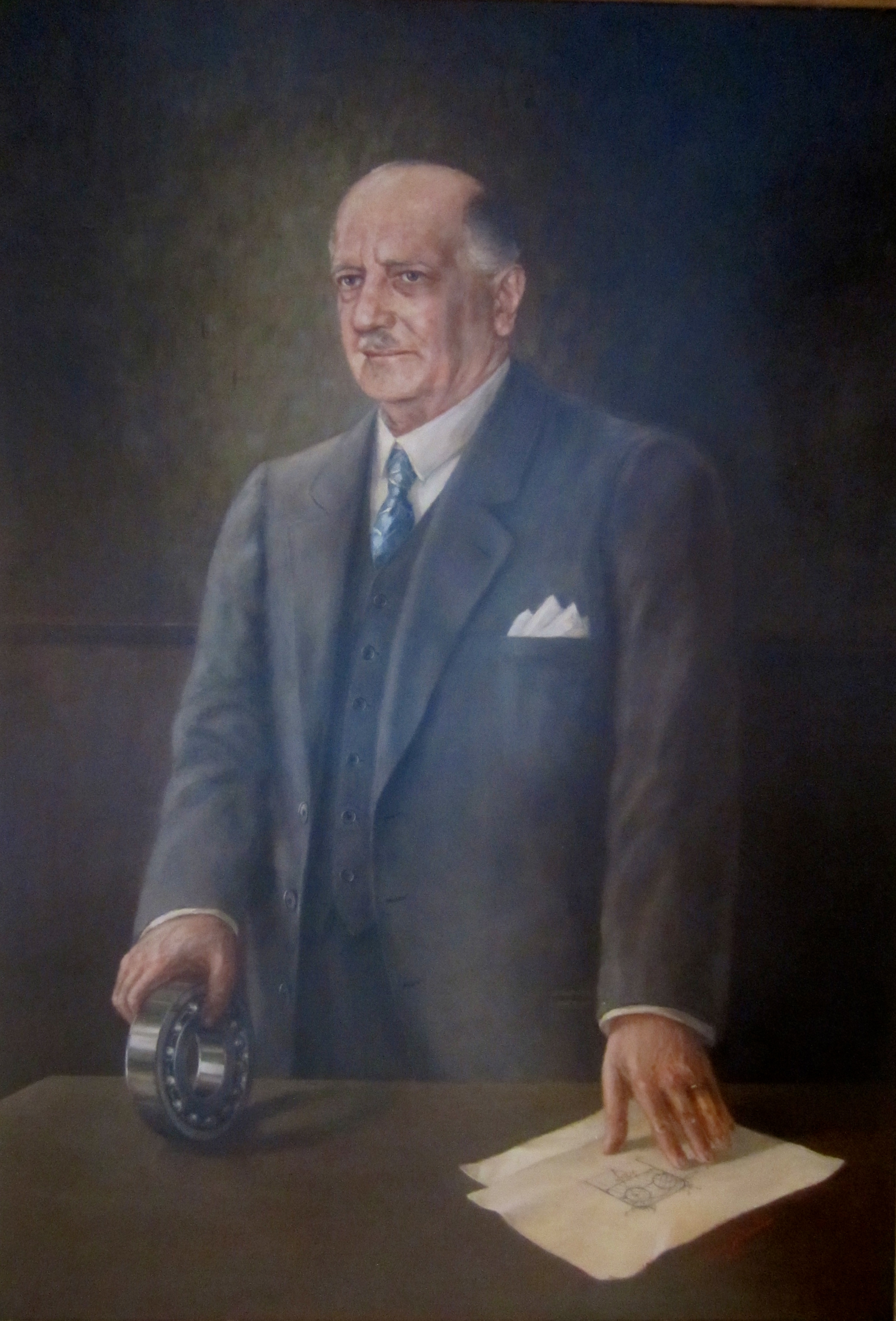
Sven Wingquist - oil on canvas by Oskar Spitzmüller, Vienna

Sven Gustaf Wingqvist (10 December 1876 – 17 April 1953) was a Swedish engineer, inventor, and industrialist, and one of the founders of Svenska Kullagerfabriken (SKF), one of the world's leading ball bearing and roller bearing makers. Sven Wingqvist invented the multi-row self-aligning ball bearing in 1907.

== Chronology ==
- 1876: Born December 10 in Kumla Municipality south of Örebro, Sweden. His parents were railway station inspector at Hallsberg S. D. Wingqvist and Anna Lundberg.
- 1894: Graduated from Rudbecksskolan in Örebro (Örebro Technical Elementary School).
- 1899: Wingqvist was employed as an operating engineer at Gamlestadens Textile Industry in Göteborg. He worked there for many years to find a solution to the problems with frequent break downs in the ball bearings for the main drive shafts. This was caused by the ground conditions, as the factory was built on clay. The shaft bearing supports moved some fractions of millimeters from time to time, hardly measurable, but enough to induce enormous extra forces in the "stiff" bearings that were available at that time. Wingqvist spent more and more time on the development of bearings in general, collecting all sorts of technical achievements and new ideas that were presented continuously on ball bearing technology around Europe. In particular he carefully studied the report presented in 1902 by professor Richard Stribeck working at the Institute of Technology in Dresden, Germany, where he had compared ball bearings versus plain bearings from a scientific point of view. Wingqvist soon realized that ball bearings had a future and that there was room for innovation. At his instignation a small workshop was set up within the premises of the Gamlestadens factory where tests could be carried out on different designs and steel materials. In 1906 he was granted a patent for a Single-row self-aligning ball bearing, Swedish patent reg. No. 24160, but this type of bearing had the disadvantage that it was poor for axial loads. He continued to work in order to find a solution for a self-aligning bearing that also could carry axial loads.
- 1907: On the initiative of Sven Wingqvist and the owners of Gamlestadens Textile Industry, SKF was founded February 16, at first as a subsidiary company to Gamlestadens Textile Industry. He was appointed the managing director as well as technical manager. Axel Carlander, son of one of the owners of Gamlestadens Textile Industry, was appointed CEO for SKF. (Axel Carlander held the position as CEO for SKF until 1937). On May 21, SKF filed the patent application at the Swedish Patent and Registration Office (PRV) for a Multi-row self-aligning radial ball bearing. The patent was granted June 6 with patent reg. No. 25406. Inventor: S.G. Wingqvist. In the patent application a double-row as well as a triple-row ball bearing is described. Within the same period of time, patent applications were sent out by SKF to 10 different countries, among them France, Germany, England and the United States, and patent was granted in all these countries within a short time. The door was now open for worldwide expansion. After the new factory had been built in Göteborg, SKF sales companies and new manufacturing plants were built in many countries around the world. The first SKF manufacturing plant outside Sweden was set up in Luton, England 1911.
- 1919: Wingqvist marries Hildur Hult (1892–1963).
- 1919–1932: Wingqvist works as an independent consulting engineer and as part-time CEO for SKF.
- 1938–1953: CEO for SKF.
- 1933–38: Managing director for AB Bofors.
- 1938–46: CEO for AB Bofors.
- 1941–53: CEO for the company Svenska Flygmotor AB.

== Some of Sven Wingqvist's Swedish patents (Sweden reg. No.) ==
- 25406 Multi-row self-aligning radial ball bearing, 1907
- 26266 Self-aligning ball bearing for axial loads, 1908
- 27397 Tool for precision measurements, 1908
- 31707 2-row spherical roller bearing, 1910
- 33901 Ball holder device, Wingqvist and H. Olsson, 1910
- 57197 Roller bearing with pressure flange, Wingqvist and N.A. Palmgren, 1919
- 78223 Device for 2-row roller bearings, 1931

== Image gallery ==
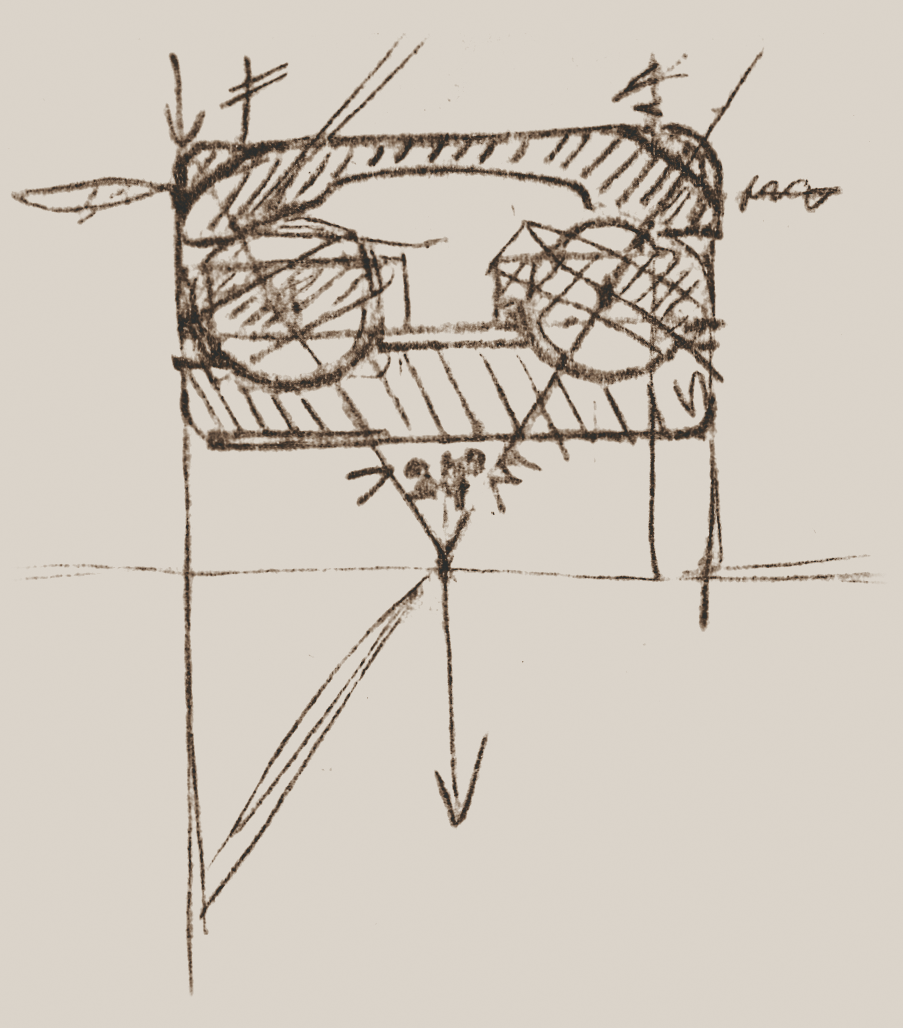
Early sketch, around 1906, by Sven Wingqvist for a double-row self-aligning bearing.

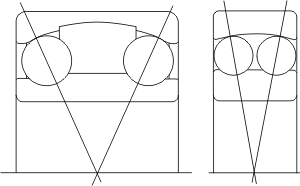
Sven Wingqvist self-aligning ball bearing. First version 1906 to the left and final version 1907. Compare the hand drawn sketch from 1906. Redrawn original drawings from SKF archive.

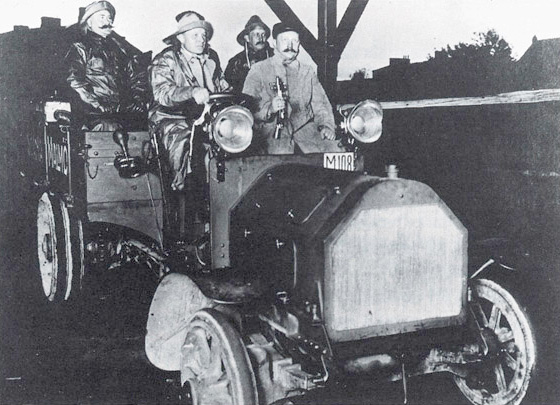
SKF bearing field test on a Scania truck (1909). S. Wingquist on backseat right.

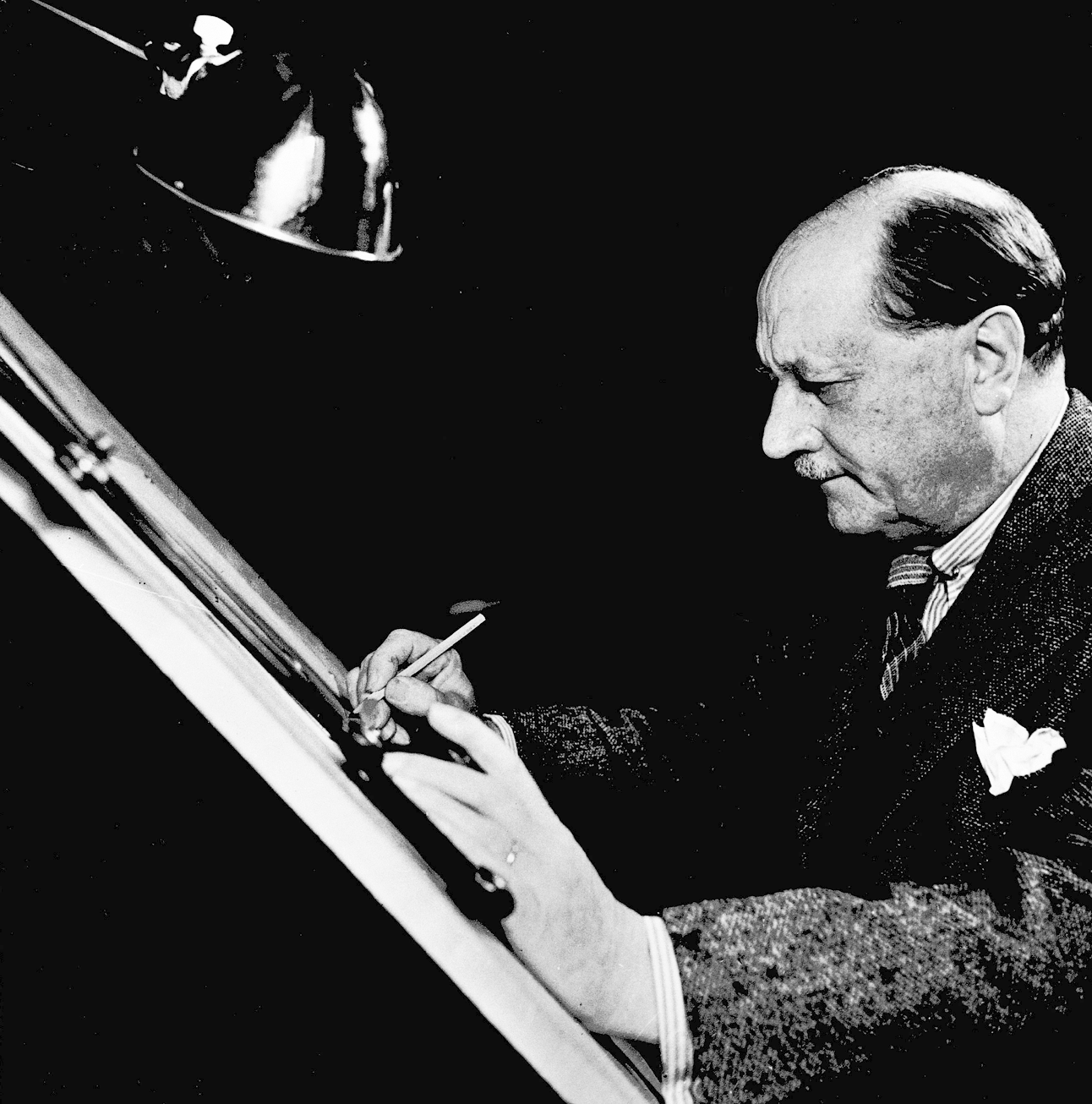
Sven Wingquist at his drawing board around 1940.

== Sources ==
- Vingqvist, Herman: Släkten Wingqvist från Södra Ving jämte upptecknarens antavla, Skara 1936. p. 20.
- SKF - The History of a Swedish Export Industry, 1907–1957 by Birger Steckzén, 1957. Published by SKF, 1957.
- "The history of SKF, 1977, Sv. kullagerfabriken, Göteborg, 1977.
- "SKF - a global story: 1907–2007", Martin Fritz, Birgit Karlsson; translated by Linda Schenck, Informationsförlaget, Stockholm, 2006. ISBN 978-91-7736-576-1
