= John Wyrill Christian =

British metallurgist

John Wyrill Christian FRS (9 April 1926 – 27 February 2001) was a British metallurgist.

Christian is worldwide recognized for his contribution on the foundation of modern understanding on Martensitic transformation.

His book The Theory of Transformations in Metals and Alloys, published in 1965, soon became the standard book for teaching phase transformation.

== Life ==
John graduated from Queen's College, Oxford. He later on became a research student in the laboratory of Dr. William Hume-Rothery, the founder of Oxford's metallurgy department. He received his doctorate in 1949 and became a university lecturer in 1955, a reader in 1958, fellow of St Edmund Hall, Oxford in 1963, and professor of physical metallurgy in 1963.
