= Stribeck curve =

Film lubrication versus surface friction

The Stribeck curve is a fundamental concept in the field of tribology. It shows that friction in fluid-lubricated contacts is a non-linear function of the contact load, the lubricant viscosity and the lubricant entrainment speed. The discovery and underlying research is usually attributed to Richard Stribeck and Mayo D. Hersey, who studied friction in journal bearings for railway wagon applications during the first half of the 20th century; however, other researchers have arrived at similar conclusions before. The mechanisms along the Stribeck curve have been in parts also understood today on the atomistic level.

== Concept ==
Schematic Stribeck curve(Hersey number on horizontal axis, Friction coefficient on vertical) 1. Boundary lubrication 2. Mixed lubrication 3. Hydrodynamic lubrication

For a contact of two fluid-lubricated surfaces, the Stribeck curve shows the relationship between the so-called Hersey number, a dimensionless lubrication parameter, and the friction coefficient. The Hersey number is defined as:

$$\begin{align}
\text{Hersey number} = \frac{\eta \cdot N}{P} ,
\end{align}$$

where η is the dynamic viscosity of the fluid, N is the entrainment speed of the fluid and P is the normal load per length of the tribological contact.

Hersey's original formula uses the rotational speed (revolutions per unit time) for N and the load per projected area (i.e. the product of a journal bearing's length and diameter) for P.

Alternatively, the Hersey number is the dimensionless number obtained from the velocity (m/s) times the dynamic viscosity (Pa∙s = N∙s/m2), divided by the load per unit length of bearing (N/m).

Thus, for a given viscosity and load, the Stribeck curve shows how friction changes with increasing velocity. Based on the typical progression of the Stribeck curve (see right), three lubrication regimes can be identified.

1. Boundary lubrication
  - Solid surfaces come into direct contact, load supported mainly by surface asperities, high friction
2. Mixed lubrication
  - Some asperity contact, load supported by both asperities and the liquid lubricant.
3. Hydrodynamic lubrication
  - Negligible asperity contact, load supported mainly by hydrodynamic pressure.

== History ==
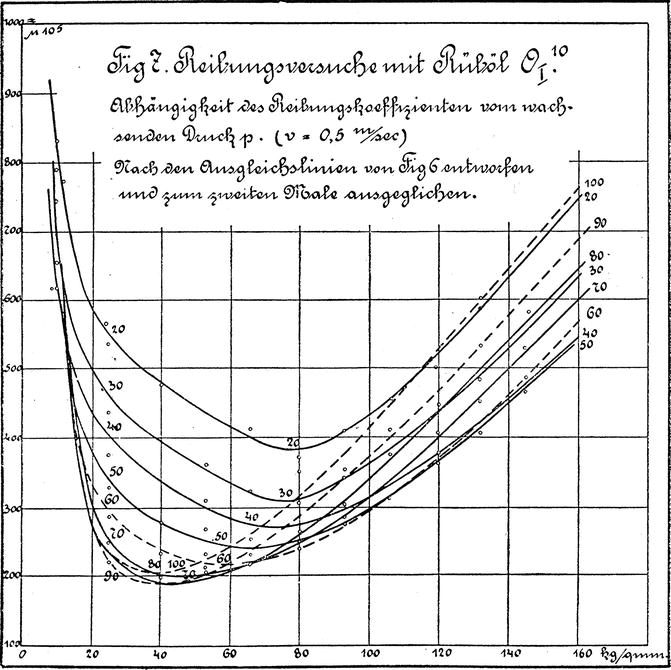
A typical Stribeck curve obtained by Martens

Richard Stribeck's research was performed in Berlin at the Royal Prussian Technical Testing Institute (MPA, now BAM), and his results were presented on 5 December 1901 during a public session of the railway society and published on 6 September 1902. Similar work was previously performed around 1885 by Adolf Martens at the same institute, and also in the mid-1870s by Robert Henry Thurston at the Stevens Institute of Technology in the U.S. The reason why the form of the friction curve for liquid lubricated surfaces was later attributed to Stribeck – although both Thurston and Martens achieved their results considerably earlier – may be because Stribeck published his findings in the most important technical journal in Germany at that time, Zeitschrift des Vereins Deutscher Ingenieure (VDI, Journal of German Mechanical Engineers). Martens published his results in the official journal of the Royal Prussian Technical Testing Institute, which has now become BAM. The VDI journal provided wide access to Stribeck's data and later colleagues rationalized the results into the three classical friction regimes. Thurston did not have the experimental means to record a continuous graph of the coefficient of friction but only measured it at discrete points. This may be the reason why the minimum in the coefficient of friction for a liquid-lubricated journal bearing was not discovered by him, but was demonstrated by the graphs of Martens and Stribeck.

The graphs plotted by Martens show the coefficient of friction either as a function of pressure, speed or temperature (i.e. viscosity), but not of their combination to the Hersey number. Schmidt attempts to do this using Marten's data. The curves' characteristic minima seem to correspond to very low Hersey numbers in the range 0.00005-0.00015.

== Calculation of Stribeck Curve ==
In general, there are two approaches for the calculation of Stribeck curve in all lubrication regimes. In the first approach, the governing flow and surface deformation equations (the system of the Elastohydrodynamic Lubrication equations) are solved numerically. Although the numerical solutions can be relatively accurate, this approach is computationally expensive and requires substantial computational resources. The second approach relies on the load-sharing concept that can be used to solve the problem approximately but at a significantly less computational cost.

In the second approach, the general problem is split up into two sub-problems: 1) lubrication problem assuming smooth surfaces and 2) a “dry” rough contact problem. The two sub-problems are coupled through the load carried by the lubricant and by the “dry” contact. In its simplest approximation, the lubrication sub-problem can be represented via a central film thickness fit to calculate the film thickness and the Greenwood-Williamson model for the “dry” contact sub-problem. This approach can give a reasonable qualitative prediction of the friction evolution; however, it is likely to overestimate friction due to the simplification assumptions used in central film thickness calculations and Greenwood-Williamson model.

An online calculator is available on www.tribonet.org that allows calculating Stribeck curve for line and point contacts. These tools are based on the load-sharing concept.

Also molecular simulation based on classical force fields can be used for predicting the Stribeck curve. Thereby, underlying molecular mechanisms can be elucidated.
