= Ceramic =

Inorganic, nonmetallic solid prepared by the action of heat

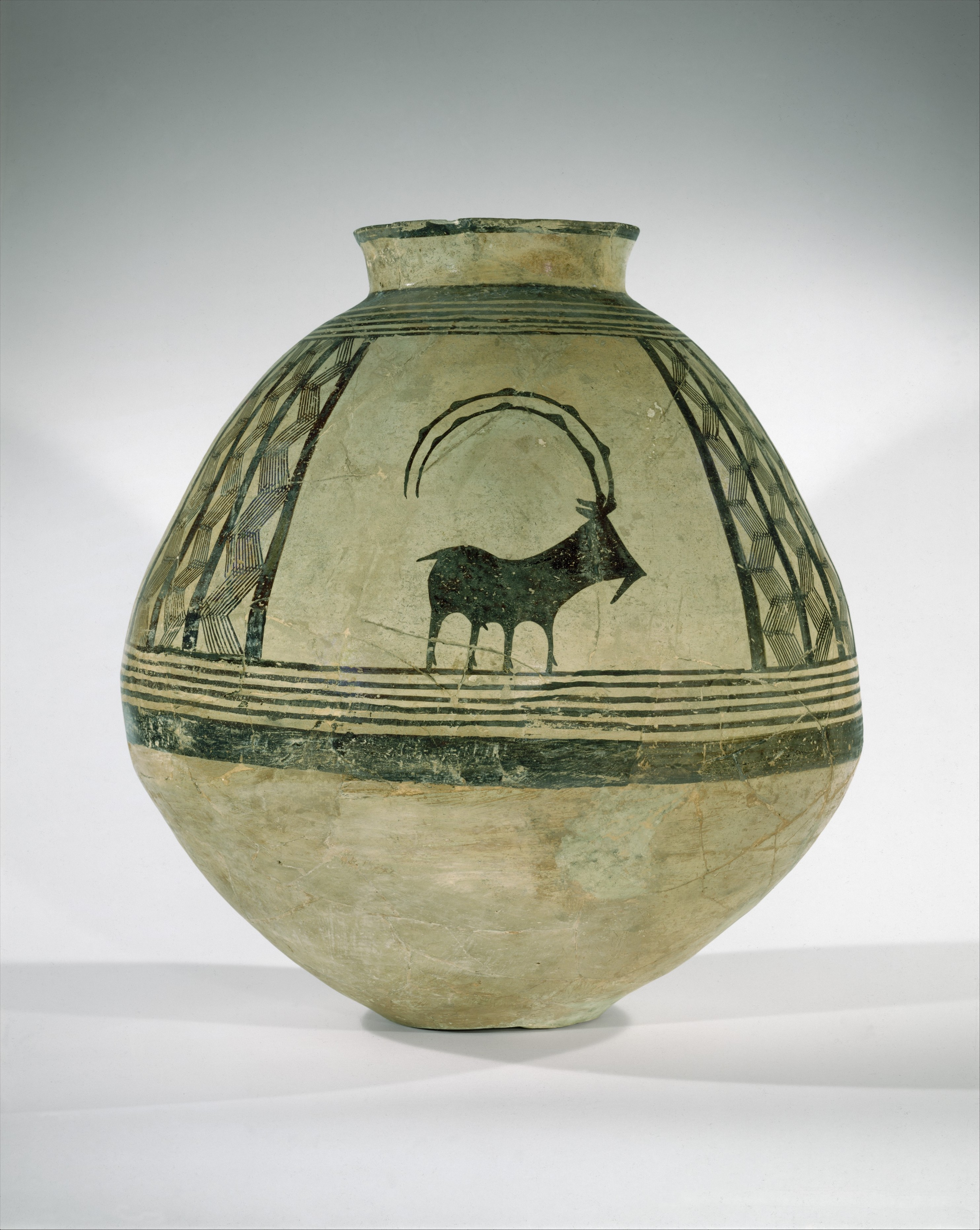
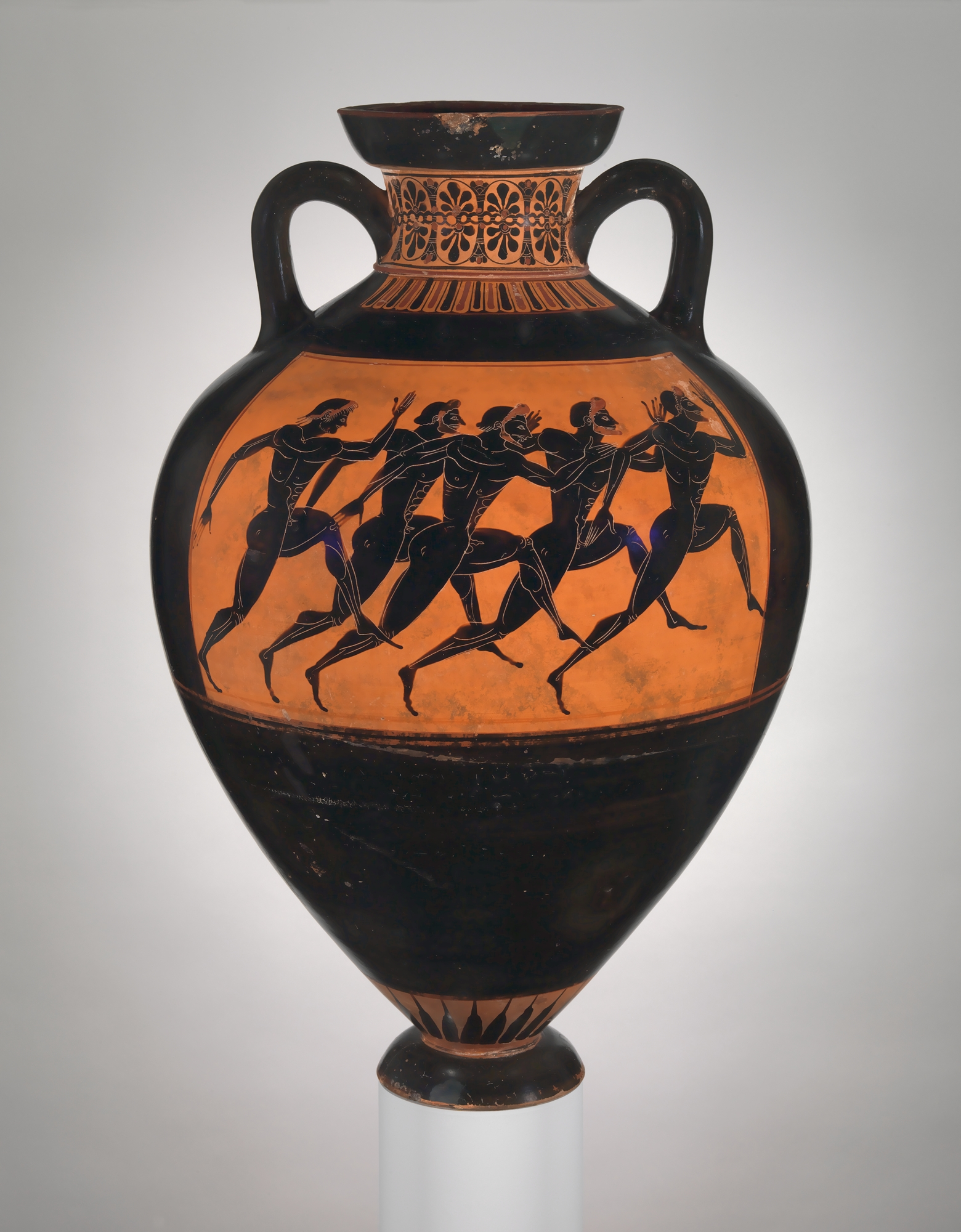
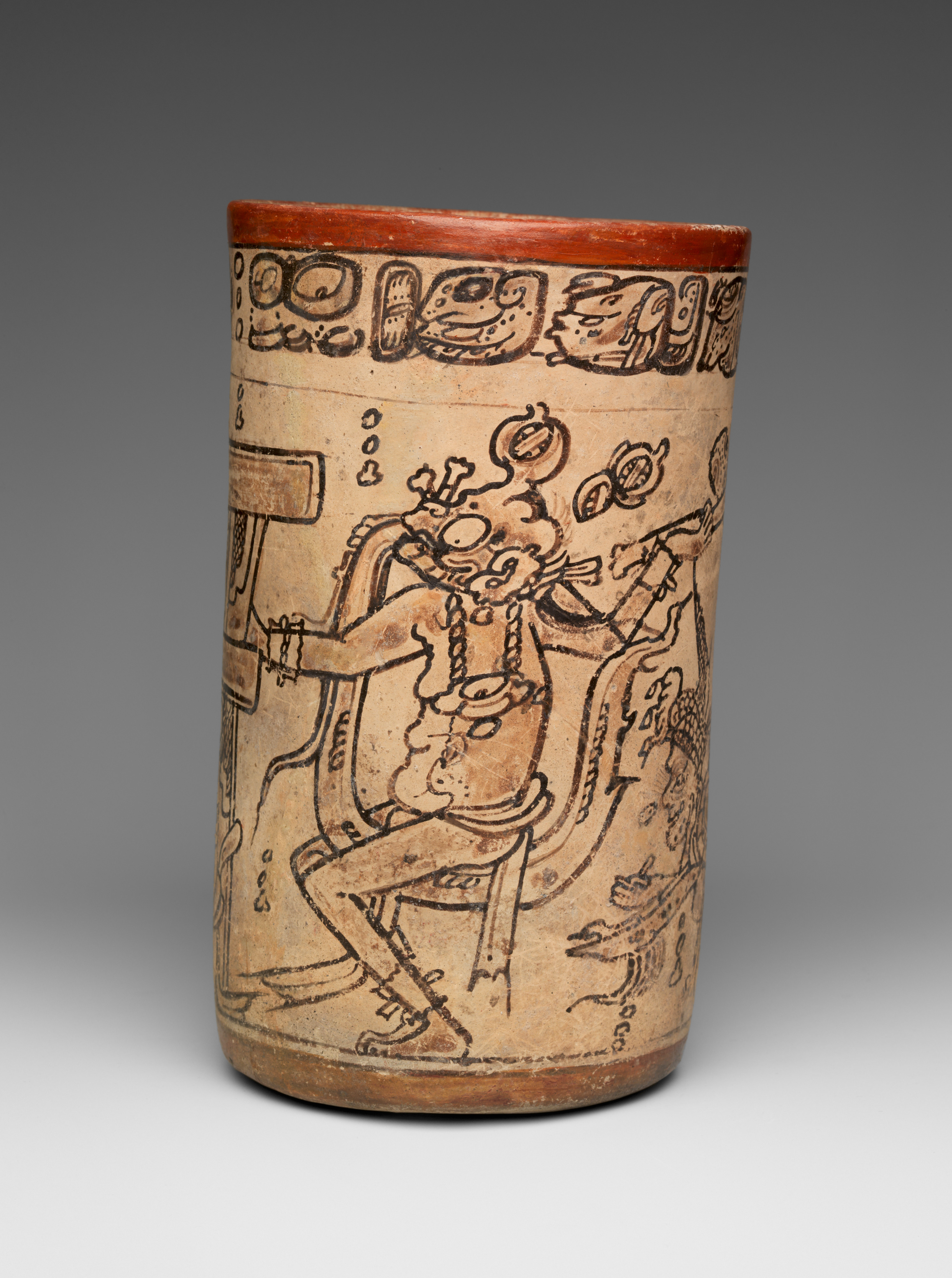
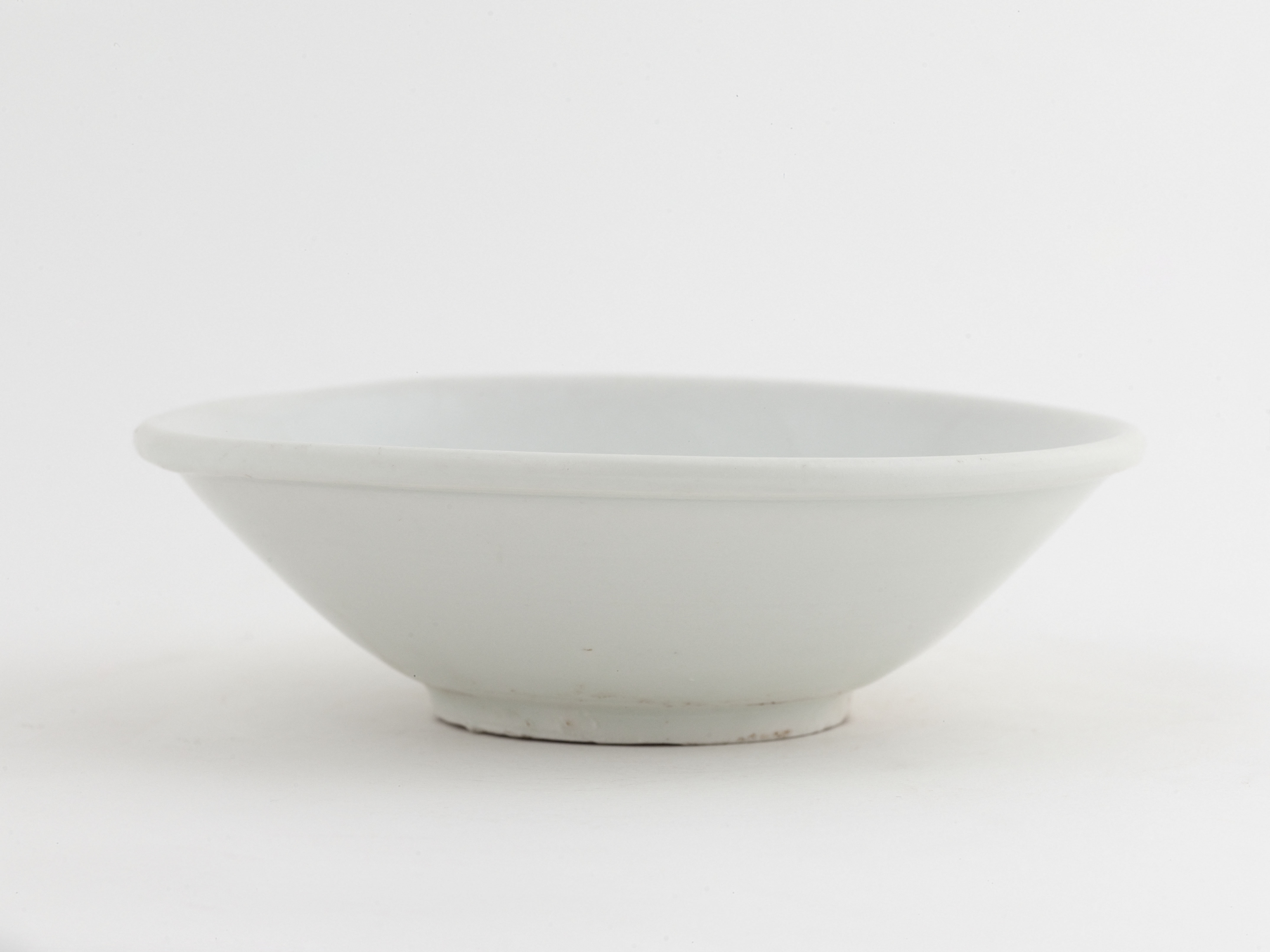
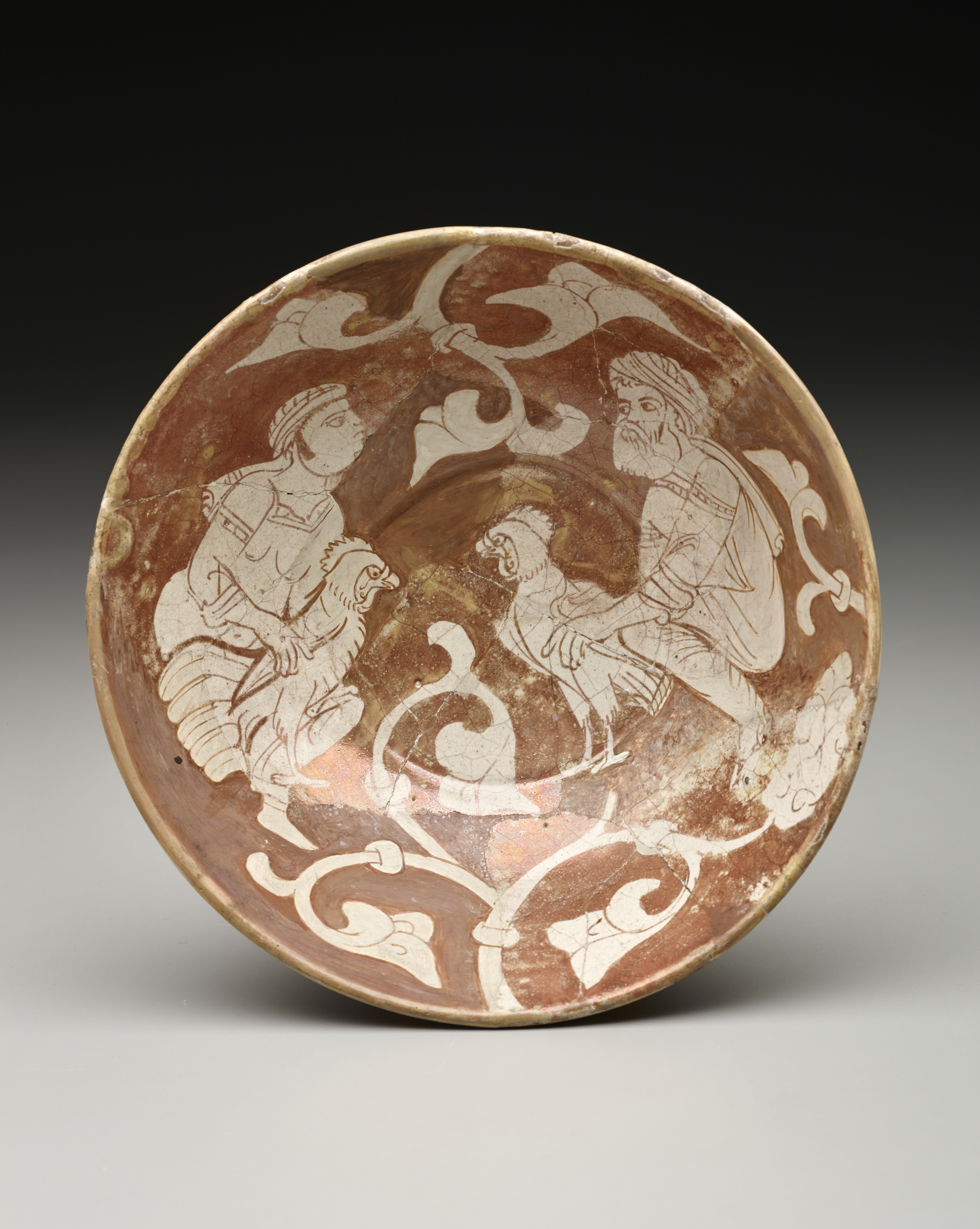
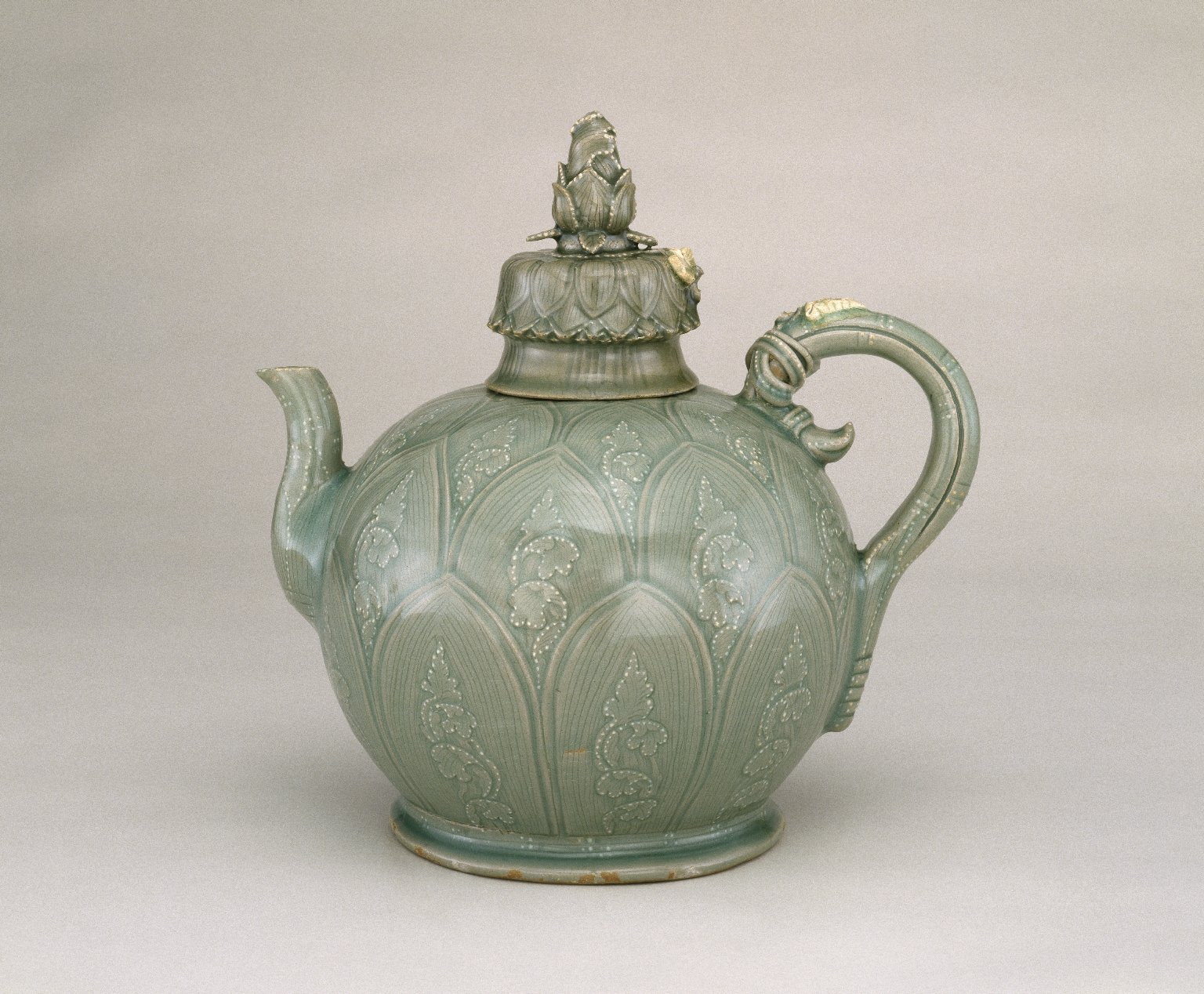
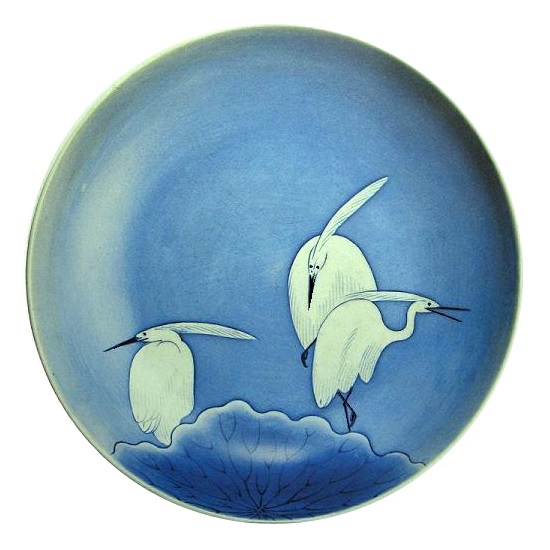
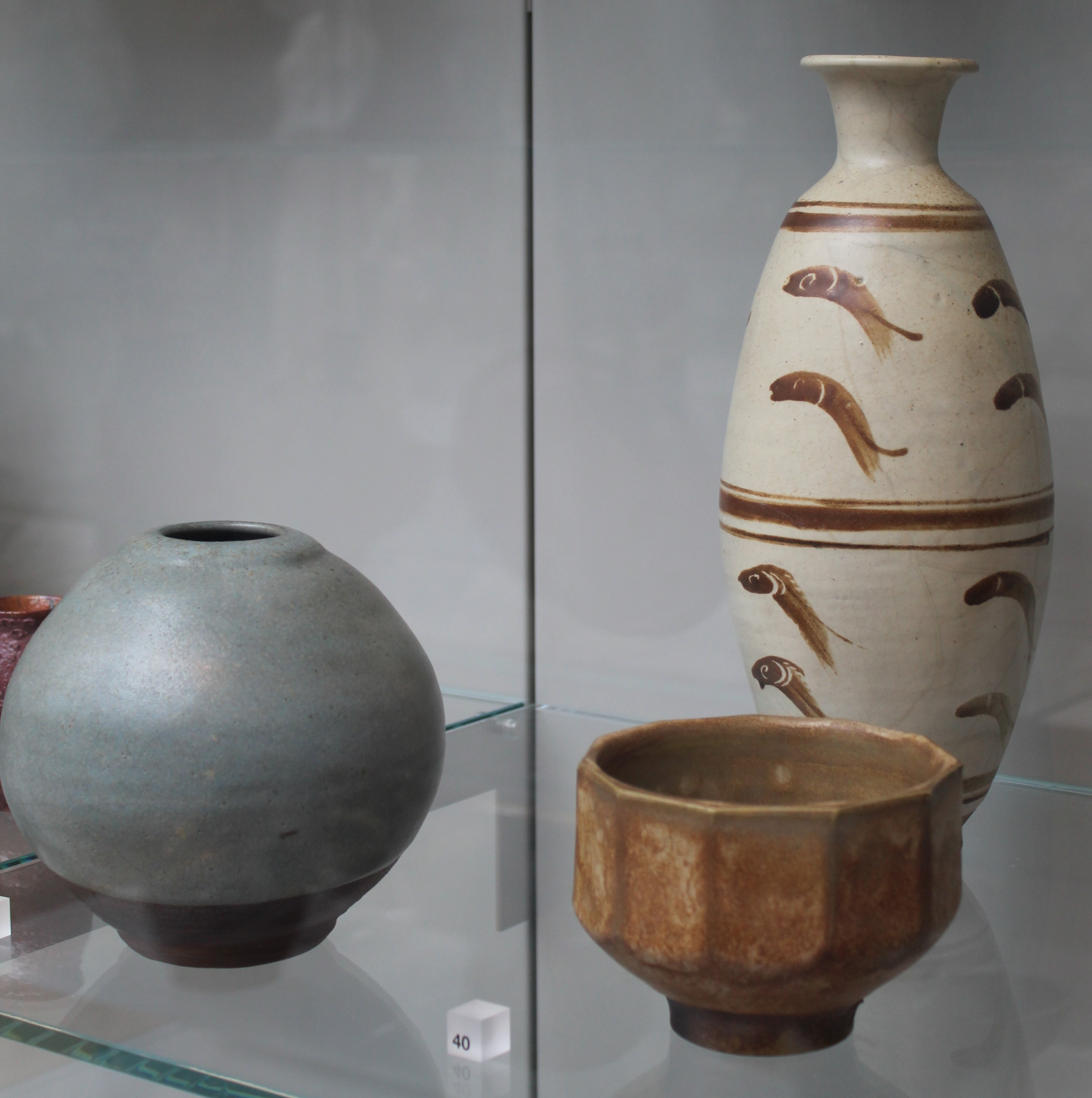
Short timeline of ceramic vessels in different styles

A ceramic is any of the various hard, brittle, heat-resistant, and corrosion-resistant materials made by shaping and then firing an inorganic, nonmetallic material, such as clay, at a high temperature. Common examples are earthenware, porcelain, and brick.

The earliest ceramics made by humans were fired clay bricks used for building house walls and other structures. Other pottery objects such as pots, vessels, vases and figurines were made from clay, either by itself or mixed with other materials like silica, hardened by sintering in fire. Later, ceramics were glazed and fired to create smooth, colored surfaces, decreasing porosity through the use of glassy, amorphous ceramic coatings on top of the crystalline ceramic substrates. Ceramics now include domestic, industrial, and building products, as well as a wide range of materials developed for use in advanced ceramic engineering, such as semiconductors.

The word ceramic (Note: Formerly also keramic.) comes from the Ancient Greek word κεραμικός (keramikós), meaning "of or for pottery" (from κέραμος (kéramos) 'potter's clay, tile, pottery'). The earliest known mention of the root ceram- is the Mycenaean Greek ke-ra-me-we, workers of ceramic, written in Linear B syllabic script. The word ceramic can be used as an adjective to describe a material, product, or process, or it may be used as a noun, either singular or, more commonly, as the plural noun ceramics.

== Materials ==
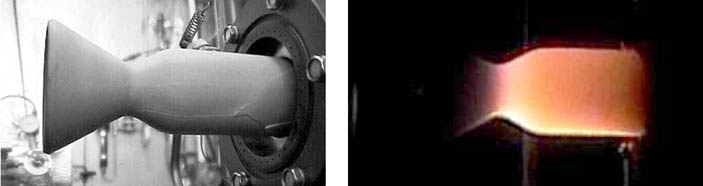
Silicon nitride rocket thruster. Left: Mounted in test stand. Right: Being tested with H_{2}/O_{2} propellants.

Ceramic material is an inorganic, metallic oxide, nitride, or carbide material. Some elements, such as carbon or silicon, may be considered ceramics. Ceramic materials are brittle, hard, strong in compression, and weak in shearing and tension. They withstand the chemical erosion that occurs in other materials subjected to acidic or caustic environments. Ceramics generally can withstand very high temperatures, ranging from 1,000 °C to 1,600 °C (1,800 °F to 3,000 °F).

A low magnification SEM micrograph of an advanced ceramic material. The properties of ceramics make fracturing an important inspection method.

The crystallinity of ceramic materials varies widely. Most often, fired ceramics are either vitrified or semi-vitrified, as is the case with earthenware, stoneware, and porcelain. Varying crystallinity and electron composition in the ionic and covalent bonds cause most ceramic materials to be good thermal and electrical insulators (researched in ceramic engineering). With such a large range of possible options for the composition/structure of a ceramic (nearly all of the elements, nearly all types of bonding, and all levels of crystallinity), the breadth of the subject is vast, and identifiable attributes (hardness, toughness, electrical conductivity) are difficult to specify for the group as a whole. General properties such as high melting temperature, high hardness, poor conductivity, high moduli of elasticity, chemical resistance, and low ductility are the norm, with known exceptions to each of these rules (piezoelectric ceramics, low glass transition temperature ceramics, superconductive ceramics).

Composites such as fiberglass and carbon fiber, while containing ceramic materials, are not considered to be part of the ceramic family.

Highly oriented crystalline ceramic materials are not amenable to a great range of processing. Methods for dealing with them tend to fall into one of two categories: either making the ceramic in the desired shape by reaction in situ or "forming" powders into the desired shape and then sintering to form a solid body. Ceramic forming techniques include shaping by hand (sometimes including a rotation process called "throwing"), slip casting, tape casting (used for making very thin ceramic capacitors), injection molding, dry pressing, and other variations.

Many ceramics experts do not consider materials with an amorphous (noncrystalline) character (i.e., glass) to be ceramics, even though glassmaking involves several steps of the ceramic process and its mechanical properties are similar to those of ceramic materials. However, heat treatments can convert glass into a semi-crystalline material known as glass-ceramic.

Traditional ceramic raw materials include clay minerals such as kaolinite, whereas more recent materials include aluminium oxide, more commonly known as alumina. Modern ceramic materials, which are classified as advanced ceramics, include silicon carbide and tungsten carbide. Both are valued for their abrasion resistance and are therefore used in applications such as the wear plates of crushing equipment in mining operations. Advanced ceramics are also used in the medical, electrical, electronics, and armor industries.

== History ==
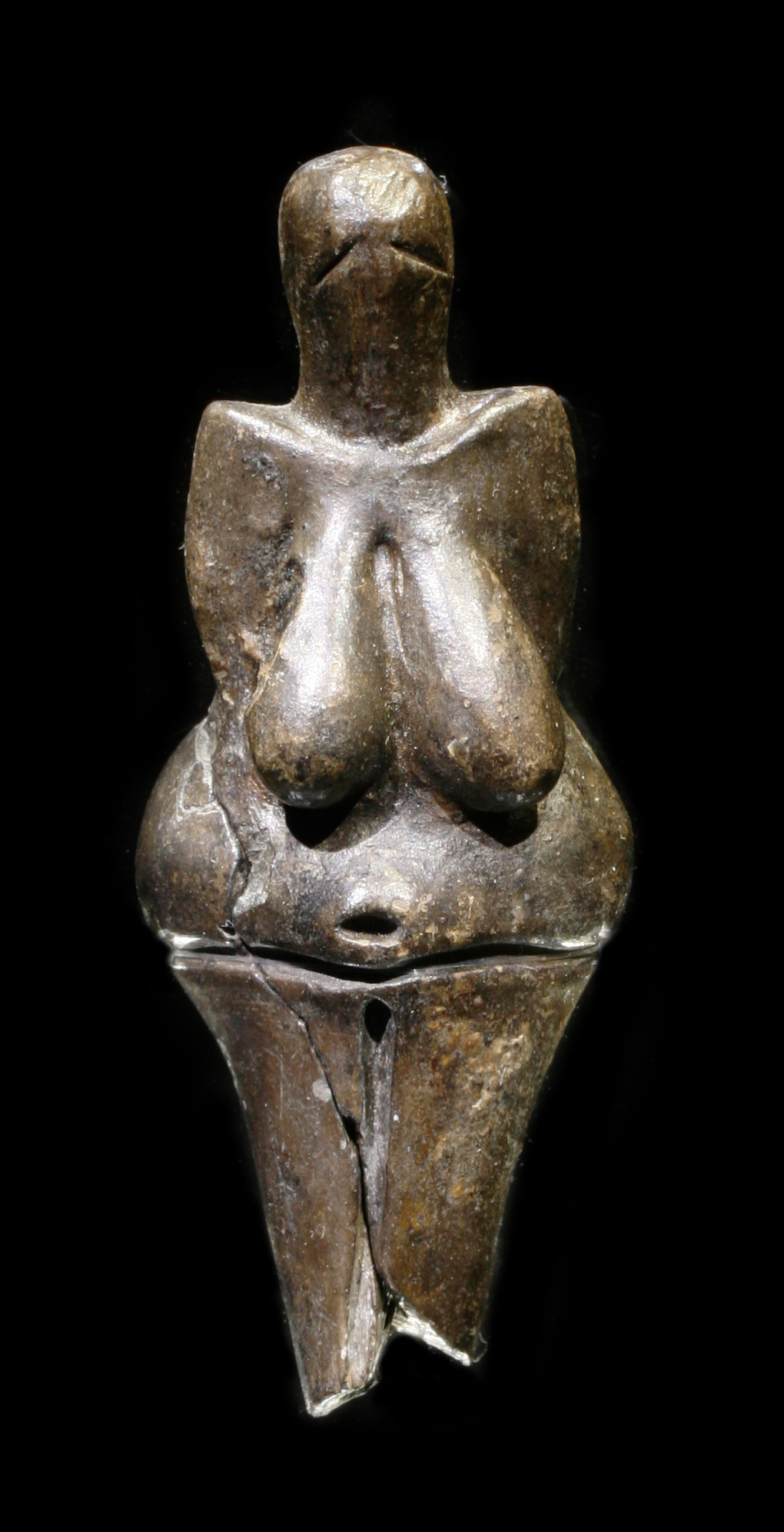
Earliest known ceramics are the Gravettian figurines that date to 29,000–25,000 BC.

Human beings appear to have been making their own ceramics for at least 26,000 years, subjecting clay and silica to intense heat to fuse and form ceramic materials. The earliest found so far were in southern central Europe and were sculpted figures, not dishes. The earliest known pottery was made by mixing animal products with clay and firing it at up to 800 °C (1,500 °F). While pottery fragments have been found up to 19,000 years old, it was not until about 10,000 years later that regular pottery became common. An early people that spread across much of Europe is named after its use of pottery: the Corded Ware culture. These early Indo-European peoples decorated their pottery by wrapping it with rope while it was still wet. When the ceramics were fired, the rope burned off but left a decorative pattern of complex grooves on the surface.

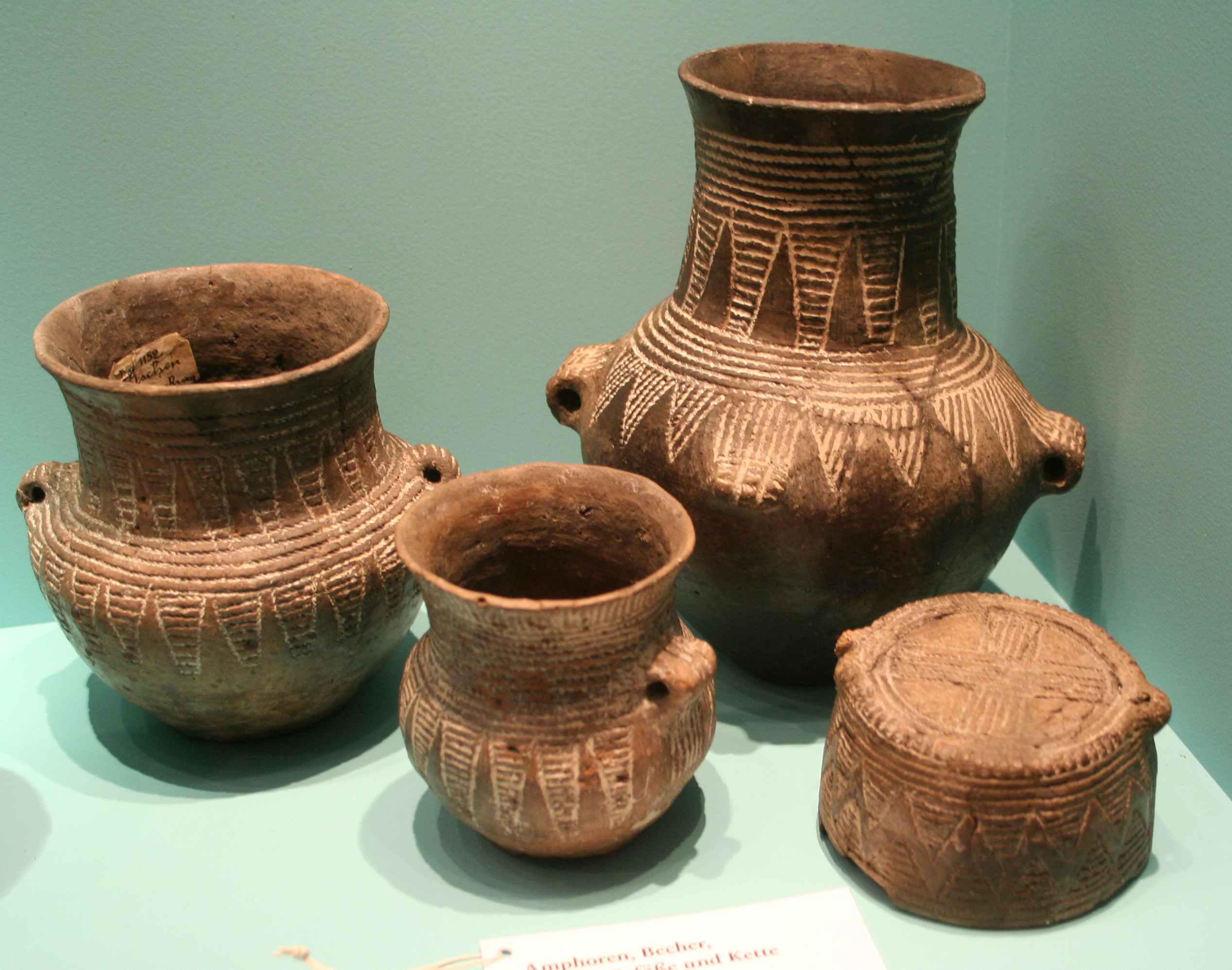
Corded-Ware culture pottery from 2500 BC

The invention of the wheel eventually led to the production of smoother, more even pottery using the wheel-forming (throwing) technique, like the pottery wheel. Early ceramics were porous, absorbing water easily. It became useful for more items with the discovery of glazing techniques, which involved coating pottery with silicon, bone ash, or other materials that could melt and reform into a glassy surface, making a vessel less impervious to water.

=== Archaeology ===
Ceramic artifacts have an important role in archaeology for understanding the culture, technology, and behavior of peoples of the past. They are among the most common artifacts to be found at an archaeological site, generally in the form of small fragments of broken pottery called sherds. The processing of collected sherds can be consistent with two main types of analysis: technical and traditional.

The traditional analysis involves sorting ceramic artifacts, sherds, and larger fragments into specific types based on style, composition, manufacturing, and morphology. By creating these typologies, it is possible to distinguish between different cultural styles, the purpose of the ceramic, and the technological state of the people, among other conclusions. Besides, by looking at stylistic changes in ceramics over time, it is possible to separate (seriate) the ceramics into distinct diagnostic groups (assemblages). A comparison of ceramic artifacts with known dated assemblages allows for a chronological assignment of these pieces.

The technical approach to ceramic analysis involves a finer examination of the composition of ceramic artifacts and sherds to determine the source of the material and, through this, the possible manufacturing site. Key criteria are the composition of the clay and the temper used in the manufacture of the article under study: the temper is a material added to the clay during the initial production stage and is used to aid the subsequent drying process. Types of temper include shell pieces, granite fragments, and ground sherd pieces called 'grog'. Temper is usually identified by microscopic examination of the tempered material. Clay identification is determined by a process of refiring the ceramic and assigning a color to it using Munsell Soil Color notation. By estimating both the clay and temper compositions and locating a region where both are known to occur, an assignment of the material source can be made. Based on the source assignment of the artifact, further investigations can be made into the site of manufacture.

== Properties ==
The physical properties of any ceramic substance are a direct result of its crystalline structure and chemical composition. Solid-state chemistry reveals the fundamental connection between microstructure and properties, such as localized density variations, grain size distribution, type of porosity, and second-phase content, which can all be correlated with ceramic properties such as mechanical strength σ by the Hall-Petch equation, hardness, toughness, dielectric constant, and the optical properties exhibited by transparent materials.

Ceramography is the art and science of preparation, examination, and evaluation of ceramic microstructures. Evaluation and characterization of ceramic microstructures are often implemented on similar spatial scales to that used commonly in the emerging field of nanotechnology: from nanometers to tens of micrometers (μm). This is typically somewhere between the minimum wavelength of visible light and the resolution limit of the naked eye.

The microstructure includes most grains, secondary phases, grain boundaries, pores, micro-cracks, structural defects, and hardness micro indentions. Most bulk mechanical, optical, thermal, electrical, and magnetic properties are significantly affected by the observed microstructure. The fabrication method and process conditions are generally indicated by the microstructure. The root cause of many ceramic failures is evident in the cleaved and polished microstructure. Physical properties which constitute the field of materials science and engineering include the following:

=== Mechanical properties ===
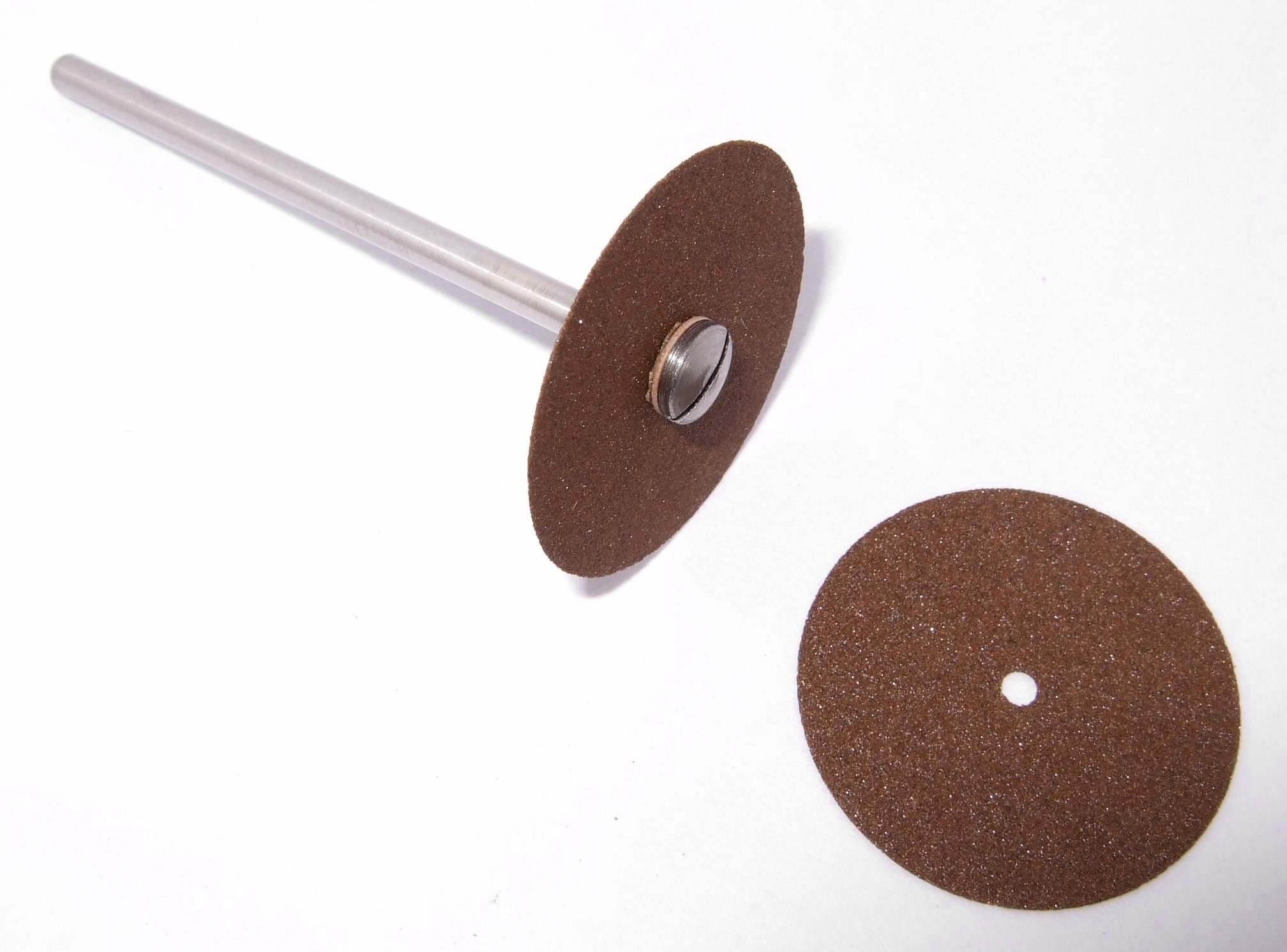
Cutting disks made of silicon carbide

Mechanical properties are important in structural and building materials as well as textile fabrics. In modern materials science, fracture mechanics is an important tool in improving the mechanical performance of materials and components. It applies the physics of stress and strain, in particular the theories of elasticity and plasticity, to the microscopic crystallographic defects found in real materials in order to predict the macroscopic mechanical failure of bodies. Fractography is widely used with fracture mechanics to understand the causes of failures and also verify the theoretical failure predictions with real-life failures.

Ceramic materials are usually ionic or covalent bonded materials. A material held together by either type of bond will tend to fracture before any plastic deformation takes place, which results in poor toughness and brittle behavior in these materials. Additionally, because these materials tend to be porous, pores and other microscopic imperfections act as stress concentrators, decreasing the toughness further, and reducing the tensile strength. These combine to give catastrophic failures, as opposed to the more ductile failure modes of metals.

These materials do show plastic deformation. However, because of the rigid structure of crystalline material, there are very few available slip systems for dislocations to move, and so they deform very slowly.

To overcome the brittle behavior, ceramic material development has introduced the class of ceramic matrix composite materials, in which ceramic fibers are embedded and with specific coatings form fiber bridges across any crack. This mechanism substantially increases the fracture toughness of such ceramics. Ceramic disc brakes are an example of using a ceramic matrix composite material manufactured with a specific process.

Scientists are working on developing ceramic materials that can withstand significant deformation without breaking. A first such material that can deform in room temperature was found in 2024.

==== Toughening mechanisms ====
Many strategies are employed to improve the toughness of ceramics to prevent fracture. This includes crack deflection, microcrack toughening, crack bridging, incorporation of ductile particles, and transformation toughening.

Crack deflection is a toughening mechanism that involves deflecting cracks away from more rapid crack propagation paths, preventing catastrophic sudden failure. Cracks may be deflected using microstructures such as whiskers, as in the use of silicon carbide whiskers to reinforce molybdenum disilicide ceramic material detailed in a 1987 paper. Crack deflecting second phases may also take the form of platelets, particles, or fibers.

Microcrack toughening involves nucleation (creation) of microcracks near a macroscopic crack tip where the crack propagates, which lowers the stress experienced by the tip and therefore the urgency of crack propagation. To improve toughness, second phase particles can be incorporated into ceramic such that they are subject to microcracking, which relieves stress to prevent fracture.

Crack bridging occurs when a strong discontinuous reinforcing phase applies a force behind the propagating tip of the crack that discourages further cracking. These second phase bridges essentially pin the crack to discourage its extension. Crack bridging can be used to improve toughness via the incorporation of second phase whiskers in the ceramic, as well as other shapes, to bridge cracks.

Ductile particle ceramic matrix composites are composed of ductile particles such as metals distributed in a ceramic matrix. These particles boost toughness by deforming plastically to absorb energy, and by bridging advancing cracks. To be most effective, the particles should be isolated from each other. The most studied iterations of these composites consist of an alumina matrix, and nickel, iron, molybdenum, copper, or silver metal particles.

Transformation toughening occurs when a material undergoes stress-induced phase transformation. Some ceramics are capable of undergoing stress-induced martensitic transformation, which involves an energy barrier that must be overcome by absorbing energy. Martensitic transformations are diffusionless shear transformations involving the transition between an "austenite" or "parent" phase that is stable at higher temperatures and a "martensitic" phase that is stable at lower temperatures. Because the transformation absorbs energy, stress-induced martensitic transformations can hinder crack progression and increases toughness. A key example of this phenomenon is zirconia, whose martensitic transformation involves a crystal structure transformation from a tetragonal crystal structure (the austenite phase) to a monoclinic structure. The volume increase associated with transformation from tetragonal to monoclinic also relieves tensile stress at the crack, tip, further discouraging cracking and increasing toughness. When zirconia particles in a ceramic matrix undergo transformation during fabrication due to cooling, the stress fields around the particles lead to nucleation and extension of microcracks, which can also improve toughness of the material. These stress fields, as well as the particles themselves, can also contribute to crack deflection.

==== Ice-templating for enhanced mechanical properties ====
If a ceramic is subjected to substantial mechanical loading, it can undergo a process called ice-templating, which allows some control of the microstructure of the ceramic product and therefore some control of the mechanical properties. Ceramic engineers use this technique to tune the mechanical properties to their desired application. Specifically, the strength is increased when this technique is employed. Ice templating allows the creation of macroscopic pores in a unidirectional arrangement. The applications of this oxide strengthening technique are important for solid oxide fuel cells and water filtration devices.

To process a sample through ice templating, an aqueous colloidal suspension is prepared to contain the dissolved ceramic powder evenly dispersed throughout the colloid, for example yttria-stabilized zirconia (YSZ). The solution is then cooled from the bottom to the top on a platform that allows for unidirectional cooling. This forces ice crystals to grow in compliance with the unidirectional cooling, and these ice crystals force the dissolved YSZ particles to the solidification front of the solid-liquid interphase boundary, resulting in pure ice crystals lined up unidirectionally alongside concentrated pockets of colloidal particles. The sample is then heated and at the same the pressure is reduced enough to force the ice crystals to sublime and the YSZ pockets begin to anneal together to form macroscopically aligned ceramic microstructures. The sample is then further sintered to complete the evaporation of the residual water and the final consolidation of the ceramic microstructure.

During ice-templating, a few variables can be controlled to influence the pore size and morphology of the microstructure. These important variables are the initial solids loading of the colloid, the cooling rate, the sintering temperature and duration, and the use of certain additives which can influence the microstructural morphology during the process. A good understanding of these parameters is essential to understanding the relationships between processing, microstructure, and mechanical properties of anisotropically porous materials.

=== Electrical properties ===
==== Semiconductors ====
Some ceramics are semiconductors. Most of these are transition metal oxides that are II-VI semiconductors, such as zinc oxide. While there are prospects of mass-producing blue light-emitting diodes (LED) from zinc oxide, ceramicists are most interested in the electrical properties that show grain boundary effects. One of the most widely used of these is the varistor. These are devices that exhibit the property that resistance drops sharply at a certain threshold voltage. Once the voltage across the device reaches the threshold, there is a breakdown of the electrical structure in the vicinity of the grain boundaries, which results in its electrical resistance dropping from several megohms down to a few hundred ohms. The major advantage of these is that they can dissipate a lot of energy, and they self-reset; after the voltage across the device drops below the threshold, its resistance returns to being high. This makes them ideal for surge-protection applications; as there is control over the threshold voltage and energy tolerance, they find use in all sorts of applications. The best demonstration of their ability can be found in electrical substations, where they are employed to protect the infrastructure from lightning strikes. They have rapid response, are low maintenance, and do not appreciably degrade from use, making them virtually ideal devices for this application. Semiconducting ceramics are also employed as gas sensors. When various gases are passed over a polycrystalline ceramic, its electrical resistance changes. With tuning to the possible gas mixtures, very inexpensive devices can be produced.

==== Superconductivity ====
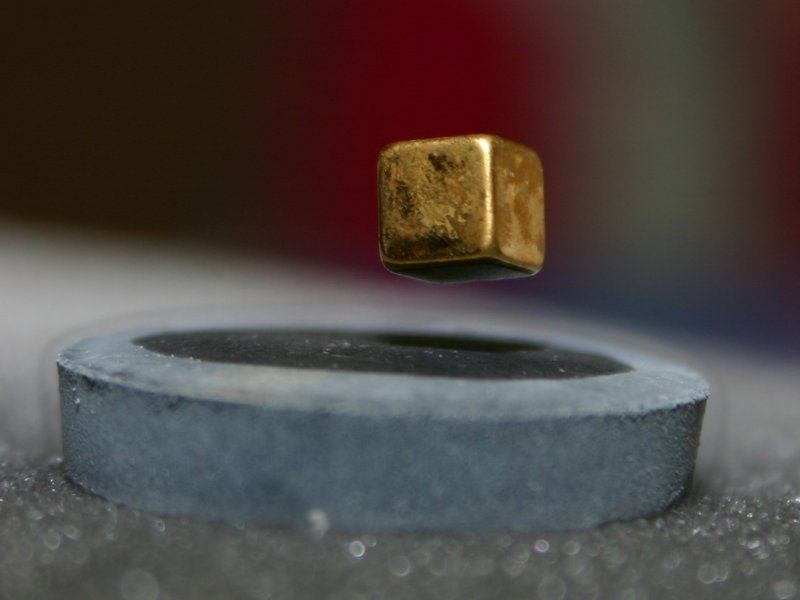
The Meissner effect demonstrated by levitating a magnet above a cuprate superconductor, which is cooled by liquid nitrogen

Under some conditions, such as extremely low temperatures, some ceramics exhibit high-temperature superconductivity (in superconductivity, "high temperature" means above 30 K). The reason for this is not understood, but there are two major families of superconducting ceramics.

==== Ferroelectricity and supersets ====
Piezoelectricity, a link between electrical and mechanical response, is exhibited by a large number of ceramic materials, including the quartz used to measure time in watches and other electronics. Such devices use both properties of piezoelectrics, using electricity to produce a mechanical motion (powering the device) and then using this mechanical motion to produce electricity (generating a signal). The unit of time measured is the natural interval required for electricity to be converted into mechanical energy and back again.

The piezoelectric effect is generally stronger in materials that also exhibit pyroelectricity, and all pyroelectric materials are also piezoelectric. These materials can be used to inter-convert between thermal, mechanical, or electrical energy; for instance, after synthesis in a furnace, a pyroelectric crystal allowed to cool under no applied stress generally builds up a static charge of thousands of volts. Such materials are used in motion sensors, where the tiny rise in temperature from a warm body entering the room is enough to produce a measurable voltage in the crystal.

In turn, pyroelectricity is seen most strongly in materials that also display the ferroelectric effect, in which a stable electric dipole can be oriented or reversed by applying an electrostatic field. Pyroelectricity is also a necessary consequence of ferroelectricity. This can be used to store information in ferroelectric capacitors, elements of ferroelectric RAM.

The most common such materials are lead zirconate titanate and barium titanate. Aside from the uses mentioned above, their strong piezoelectric response is exploited in the design of high-frequency loudspeakers, transducers for sonar, and actuators for atomic force and scanning tunneling microscopes.

==== Positive thermal coefficient ====
Temperature increases can cause grain boundaries to suddenly become insulating in some semiconducting ceramic materials, mostly mixtures of heavy metal titanates. The critical transition temperature can be adjusted over a wide range by variations in chemistry. In such materials, current will pass through the material until joule heating brings it to the transition temperature, at which point the circuit will be broken and current flow will cease. Such ceramics are used as self-controlled heating elements in, for example, the rear-window defrost circuits of automobiles.

At the transition temperature, the material's dielectric response becomes theoretically infinite. While a lack of temperature control would rule out any practical use of the material near its critical temperature, the dielectric effect remains exceptionally strong even at much higher temperatures. Titanates with critical temperatures far below room temperature have become synonymous with "ceramic" in the context of ceramic capacitors for just this reason.

=== Optical properties ===
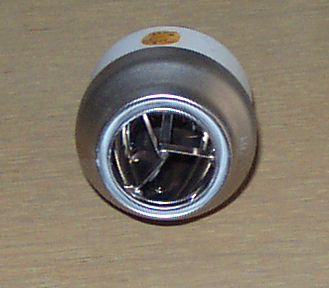
Cermax xenon arc lamp with synthetic sapphire output window

Optically transparent materials focus on the response of a material to incoming light waves of a range of wavelengths. Frequency selective optical filters can be utilized to alter or enhance the brightness and contrast of a digital image. Guided lightwave transmission via frequency selective waveguides involves the emerging field of fiber optics and the ability of certain glassy compositions as a transmission medium for a range of frequencies simultaneously (multi-mode optical fiber) with little or no interference between competing wavelengths or frequencies. This resonant mode of energy and data transmission via electromagnetic (light) wave propagation, though low powered, is virtually lossless. Optical waveguides are used as components in Integrated optical circuits (e.g. light-emitting diodes, LEDs) or as the transmission medium in local and long haul optical communication systems. Also of value to the emerging materials scientist is the sensitivity of materials to radiation in the thermal infrared (IR) portion of the electromagnetic spectrum. This heat-seeking ability is responsible for such diverse optical phenomena as night-vision and IR luminescence.

Thus, there is an increasing need in the military sector for high-strength, robust materials which have the capability to transmit light (electromagnetic waves) in the visible (0.4 – 0.7 micrometers) and mid-infrared (1 – 5 micrometers) regions of the spectrum. These materials are needed for applications requiring transparent armor, including next-generation high-speed missiles and pods, as well as protection against improvised explosive devices (IED).

In the 1960s, scientists at General Electric (GE) discovered that under the right manufacturing conditions, some ceramics, especially aluminium oxide (alumina), could be made translucent. These translucent materials were transparent enough to be used for containing the electrical plasma generated in high-pressure sodium street lamps. During the past two decades, additional types of transparent ceramics have been developed for applications such as nose cones for heat-seeking missiles, windows for fighter aircraft, and scintillation counters for computed tomography scanners. Other ceramic materials, generally requiring greater purity in their make-up than those above, include forms of several chemical compounds, including:

1. Barium titanate, often mixed with strontium titanate), displays ferroelectricity, meaning that its mechanical, electrical, and thermal responses are coupled to one another and also history-dependent. It is widely used in electromechanical transducers, ceramic capacitors, and data storage elements. Grain boundary conditions can create PTC effects in heating elements.
2. Sialon (silicon aluminium oxynitride) has high strength, resistance to thermal shock, chemical and wear resistance, and low density. These ceramics are used in non-ferrous molten metal handling, weld pins, and the chemical industry.
3. Silicon carbide (SiC) is used as a susceptor in microwave furnaces, a commonly used abrasive, and as a refractory material.
4. Silicon nitride (Si_{3}N_{4}) is used as an abrasive powder.
5. Steatite (magnesium silicates) is used as an electrical insulator.
6. Titanium carbide is used in space shuttle re-entry shields and scratchproof watches.
7. Uranium oxide (UO_{2}) is used as fuel in nuclear reactors.
8. Yttrium barium copper oxide (YBa_{2}Cu_{3}O_{7−x}) is a high-temperature superconductor.
9. Zinc oxide (ZnO) is a semiconductor used in the construction of varistors.
10. Zirconium dioxide (zirconia), which in pure form undergoes many phase changes between room temperature and practical sintering temperatures, can be chemically "stabilized" in several different forms. Its high oxygen ion conductivity recommends it for use in fuel cells and automotive oxygen sensors. In another variant, metastable structures can impart transformation toughening for mechanical applications; most ceramic knife blades are made of this material. Partially stabilised zirconia (PSZ) is much less brittle than other ceramics and is used for metal forming tools, valves and liners, abrasive slurries, kitchen knives and bearings subject to severe abrasion.

== Products ==
=== By usage ===
For convenience, ceramic products are usually divided into four main types; these are shown below with some examples:

1. Structural, including bricks, pipes, floor and roof tiles, vitrified tile
2. Refractories, such as kiln linings, gas fire radiants, steel and glass making crucibles
3. Whitewares, including tableware, cookware, wall tiles, pottery products and sanitary ware
4. Technical, also known as engineering, advanced, special, and fine ceramics. Such items include:
  - gas burner nozzles
  - ballistic protection, vehicle armor
  - nuclear fuel uranium oxide pellets
  - biomedical implants
  - coatings of jet engine turbine blades
  - ceramic matrix composite gas turbine parts
  - reinforced carbon–carbon ceramic disc brakes
  - missile nose cones
  - bearings
  - thermal insulation tiles used on the Space Shuttle orbiter

=== Ceramics made with clay ===
Frequently, the raw materials of modern ceramics do not include clays. Those that do have been classified as:

1. Earthenware, fired at lower temperatures than other types
2. Stoneware, vitreous or semi-vitreous
3. Porcelain, which contains a high content of kaolin
4. Bone china

=== Classification ===
Ceramics can also be classified into three distinct material categories:

1. Oxides: alumina, beryllia, ceria, zirconia
2. Non-oxides: carbide, boride, nitride, silicide
3. Composite materials: particulate reinforced, fiber reinforced, combinations of oxides and non-oxides.

Each one of these classes can be developed into unique material properties.

== Applications ==
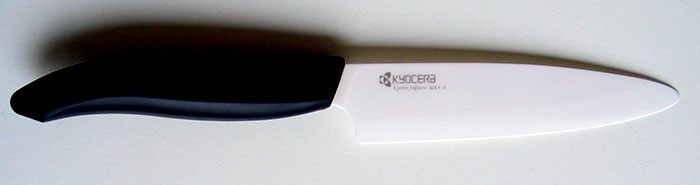
Kitchen knife with a ceramic blade

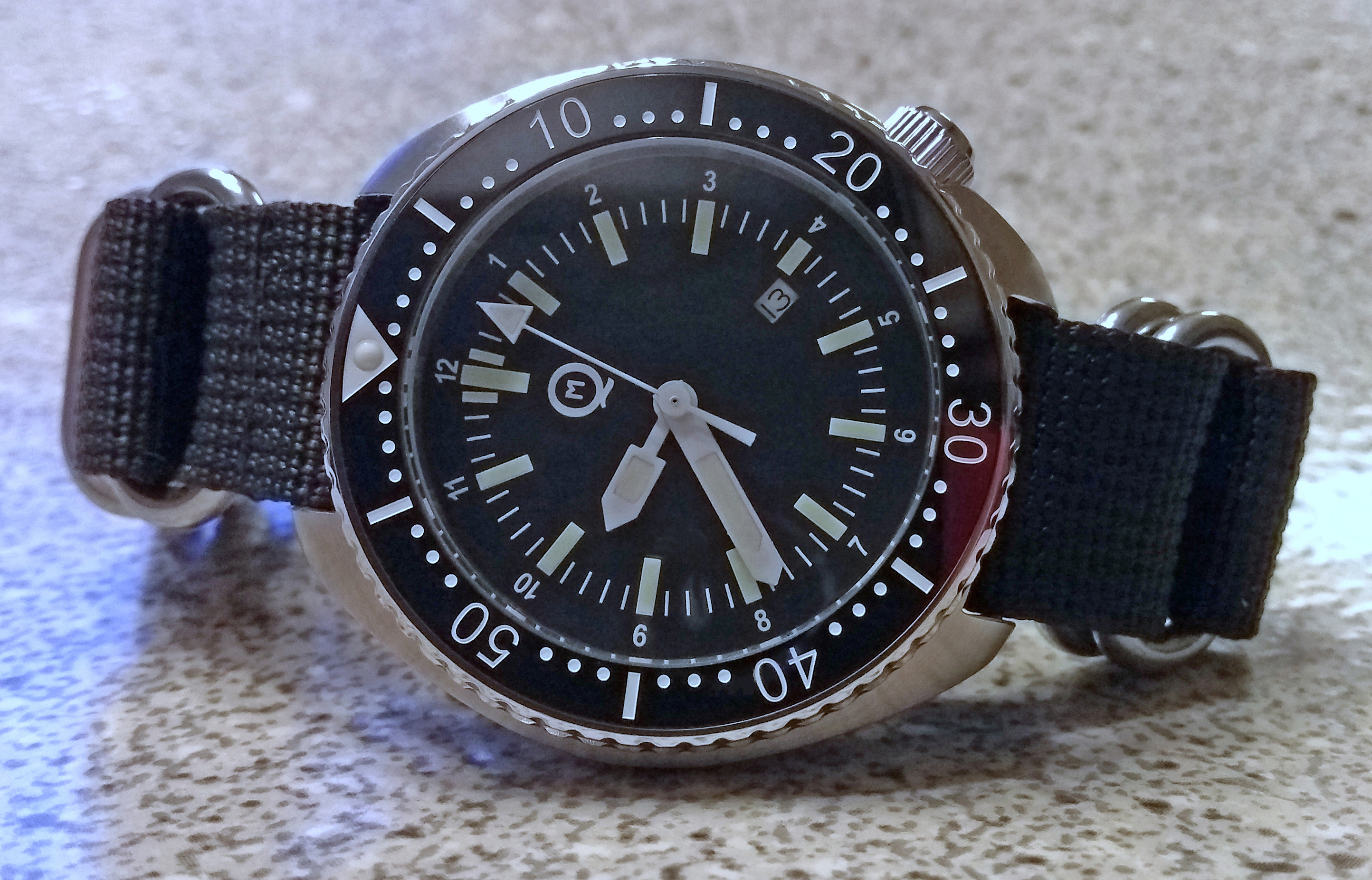
Technical ceramic used as a durable top material on a diving watch bezel insert

1. Knife blades: the blade of a ceramic knife will stay sharp for much longer than that of a steel knife, although it is more brittle and susceptible to breakage.
2. Carbon–ceramic brake disks for vehicles: highly resistant to brake fade at high temperatures.
3. Advanced composite ceramic and metal matrices have been designed for most modern armoured fighting vehicles because they offer superior penetrating resistance against shaped charge (HEAT rounds) and kinetic energy penetrators.
4. Ceramics such as alumina and boron carbide have been used as plates in ballistic armored vests to repel high-velocity rifle fire. Such plates are known commonly as small arms protective inserts, or SAPIs. Similar low-weight material is used to protect the cockpits of some military aircraft.
5. Ceramic ball bearings can be used in place of steel. Their greater hardness results in lower susceptibility to wear. Ceramic bearings typically last triple the lifetime of steel bearings. They deform less than steel under load, resulting in less contact with the bearing retainer walls and lower friction. In very high-speed applications, heat from friction causes more problems for metal bearings than ceramic bearings. Ceramics are chemically resistant to corrosion and are preferred for environments where steel bearings would rust. In some applications their electricity-insulating properties are advantageous. Drawbacks to ceramic bearings include significantly higher cost, susceptibility to damage under shock loads, and the potential to wear steel parts due to ceramics' greater hardness.
6. In the early 1980s Toyota researched production of an adiabatic engine using ceramic components in the hot gas area. The use of ceramics would have allowed temperatures exceeding 1650 °C. Advantages would include lighter materials and a smaller cooling system (or no cooling system at all), leading to major weight reduction. The expected increase of fuel efficiency (due to higher operating temperatures, demonstrated in Carnot's theorem) could not be verified experimentally. It was found that heat transfer on the hot ceramic cylinder wall was greater than the heat transfer to a cooler metal wall. This is because the cooler gas film on a metal surface acts as a thermal insulator. Thus, despite the desirable properties of ceramics, prohibitive production costs and limited advantages have prevented widespread ceramic engine component adoption. In addition, small imperfections in ceramic material along with low fracture toughness can lead to cracking and potentially dangerous equipment failure. Such engines are possible experimentally, but mass production is not feasible with current technology.
7. Experiments with ceramic parts for gas turbine engines are being conducted. Currently, even blades made of advanced metal alloys used in the engines' hot section require cooling and careful monitoring of operating temperatures. Turbine engines made with ceramics could operate more efficiently, providing for greater range and payload.
8. Recent advances have been made in ceramics which include bioceramics such as dental implants and synthetic bones. Hydroxyapatite, the major mineral component of bone, has been made synthetically from several biological and chemical components and can be formed into ceramic materials. Orthopedic implants coated with these materials bond readily to bone and other tissues in the body without rejection or inflammatory reaction. They are of great interest for gene delivery and tissue engineering scaffolding. Most hydroxyapatite ceramics are quite porous and lack mechanical strength and are therefore used solely to coat metal orthopedic devices to aid in forming a bond to bone or as bone fillers. They are also used as fillers for orthopedic plastic screws to aid in reducing inflammation and increase the absorption of these plastic materials. Work is being done to make strong, fully dense nanocrystalline hydroxyapatite ceramic materials for orthopedic weight bearing devices, replacing foreign metal and plastic orthopedic materials with a synthetic but naturally occurring bone mineral. Ultimately, these ceramic materials may be used as bone replacement, or with the incorporation of protein collagens, the manufacture of synthetic bones.
9. Applications for actinide-containing ceramic materials include nuclear fuels for burning excess plutonium (Pu), or a chemically inert source of alpha radiation in power supplies for uncrewed space vehicles or microelectronic devices. Use and disposal of radioactive actinides require immobilization in a durable host material. Long half-life radionuclides such as actinide are immobilized using chemically durable crystalline materials based on polycrystalline ceramics and large single crystals.
10. High-tech ceramics are used for producing watch cases. The material is valued by watchmakers for its light weight, scratch resistance, durability, and smooth touch. IWC is one of the brands that pioneered the use of ceramic in watchmaking.
11. Ceramics are used in the design of mobile phone bodies due to their high hardness, resistance to scratches, and ability to dissipate heat. Ceramic's thermal management properties help in maintaining optimal device temperatures during heavy use enhancing performance. Additionally, ceramic materials can support wireless charging and offer better signal transmission compared to metals, which can interfere with antennas. Companies like Apple and Samsung have incorporated ceramic in their devices.
12. Ceramics made of silicon carbide are used in pump and valve components because of their corrosion resistance characteristics. It is also used in nuclear reactors as fuel cladding materials due to their ability to withstand radiation and thermal stress. Other uses of Silicon carbide ceramics include paper manufacturing, ballistics, chemical production, and as pipe system components.

== See also ==
- Ceramic chemistry – Science and technology of creating objects from inorganic, non-metallic materials
- Ceramic engineering – Science and technology of creating objects from inorganic, non-metallic materials
- Ceramic nanoparticle – Nano-scale ceramic materials
- Ceramic matrix composite – Composite material consisting of ceramic fibers in a ceramic matrix
- Ceramic art – Decorative objects made from clay and other raw materials by the process of pottery
- Material science – Research of materials
- Pottery fracture – Result of thermal treatment on ceramic
