= Diffusionless transformation =

Shift of atomic positions in a crystal structure

Diffusionless transformation classifications

Diffusionless transformations, also referred to as displacive transformations, are solid-state changes in the crystal structure that do not rely on the diffusion of atoms over long distances. Instead, they occur due to coordinated shifts in atomic positions, where atoms move by a distance less than the span between neighboring atoms while maintaining their relative arrangement. An illustrative instance of this is the martensitic transformation observed in steel. The term "martensite" was initially used to designate the hard and finely dispersed constituent that forms in rapidly cooled steels. Subsequently, it was discovered that other materials, including non-ferrous alloys and ceramics, can undergo diffusionless transformations as well. As a result, the term "martensite" has taken on a more inclusive meaning to encompass the resulting product of such transformations. With diffusionless transformations, there is some form of cooperative, homogeneous movement that results in a change to the crystal structure during a phase change. These movements are small, usually less than their interatomic distances, and the neighbors of an atom remain close.

The systematic movement of large numbers of atoms led to some to refer to these as military transformations in contrast to civilian diffusion-based phase changes, initially by Frederick Charles Frank and John Wyrill Christian.

The most commonly encountered transformation of this type is the martensitic transformation, which is probably the most studied but is only one subset of non-diffusional transformations. The martensitic transformation in steel represents the most economically significant example of this category of phase transformations. However, an increasing number of alternatives, such as shape memory alloys, are becoming more important as well.

== Classification and definitions ==
When a structural change occurs by the coordinated movement of atoms (or groups of atoms) relative to their neighbors, the change is termed a displacive transformation. This covers a broad range of transformations so further classifications have been developed.

The first distinction can be drawn between transformations dominated by lattice-distortive strains and those where shuffles are of greater importance.

Homogeneous lattice-distortive strains, also known as Bain strains, transform one Bravais lattice into a different one. This can be represented by a strain matrix S which transforms one vector, y, into a new vector, x:

$$y=Sx$$

This is homogeneous, as straight lines are transformed into new straight lines. Examples of such transformations include a cubic lattice increasing in size on all three axes (dilation) or shearing into a monoclinic structure.

Shuffles, as the name suggests, involve the small movement of atoms within the unit cell. As a result, pure shuffles do not normally result in a shape change of the unit cell - only its symmetry and structure.

Phase transformations normally result in the creation of an interface between the transformed and parent material. The energy required to generate this new interface will depend on its nature - essentially how well the two structures fit together. An additional energy term occurs if the transformation includes a shape change since, if the new phase is constrained by the surrounding material, this may give rise to elastic or plastic deformation and hence a strain energy term. The ratio of these interfacial and strain energy terms has a notable effect on the kinetics of the transformation and the morphology of the new phase. Thus, shuffle transformations, where distortions are small, are dominated by interfacial energies and can be usefully separated from lattice-distortive transformations where the strain energy tends to have a greater effect.

A subclassification of lattice-distortive displacements can be made by considering the dilutional and shear components of the distortion. In transformations dominated by the shear component, it is possible to find a line in the new phase that is undistorted from the parent phase while all lines are distorted when the dilation is predominant. Shear-dominated transformations can be further classified according to the magnitude of the strain energies involved compared to the innate vibrations of the atoms in the lattice and hence whether the strain energies have a notable influence on the kinetics of the transformation and the morphology of the resulting phase. If the strain energy is a significant factor, then the transformations are dubbed martensitic, if not the transformation is referred to as quasi-martensitic.

== Iron-carbon martensitic transformation ==
The distinction between austenitic and martensitic steels is subtle in nature. Austenite exhibits a face-centered cubic (FCC) unit cell, whereas the transformation to martensite entails a distortion of this cube into a body-centered tetragonal shape (BCT). This transformation occurs due to a displacive process, where interstitial carbon atoms lack the time to diffuse out. Consequently, the unit cell undergoes a slight elongation in one dimension and contraction in the other two. Despite differences in the symmetry of the crystal structures, the chemical bonding between them remains similar.

The iron-carbon martensitic transformation generates an increase in hardness. The martensitic phase of the steel is supersaturated in carbon and thus undergoes solid solution strengthening. Similar to work-hardened steels, defects prevent atoms from sliding past one another in an organized fashion, causing the material to become harder.

== Pseudo martensitic transformation ==
In addition to displacive transformation and diffusive transformation, a new type of phase transformation that involves a displacive sublattice transition and atomic diffusion was discovered using a high-pressure X-ray diffraction system. The new transformation mechanism has been christened pseudo martensitic transformation.
