= Dunt =

Cracks in ceramics

Dunting is a fault that can occur during the firing of ceramic articles. It is the "cracking that occurs in fired ceramic bodies as a result of a thermally induced stress" and is caused by a "ware cooled too quickly after it has been fired".

Although usually occurring during cooling, dunts can also be caused by excessively fast heating rates. Heating dunts can be recognised by rounded edges to the cracks as the glaze matured after they occurred, whereas cooling dunts have sharp edges.

It has been found that bodies formulated with quartz rather than flint were more susceptible to dunting, especially on re-fire. It was postulated this may be related to the lower Young's modulus of the quartz based bodies.

Dunting also occurs in wares produced from montmorillonite clay bodies due to the volume expansion of cristobalite during its inversion upon cooling. "The release of free silica, takes place in montmorillonite above 950 C, but almost double the silica is released, compared to kaolin. Therefore, clay bodies with high amounts of montmorillonite contain a high percentage of free silica after firing, which may cause the ware to crack during cooling.(Dunting)"

== See also ==
- Pottery
- Ceramics (art)
