= Richard Stribeck =

Richard Stribeck (7 July 1861 in Stuttgart – 29 March 1950) was a German engineer, after whom the Stribeck Curve is named.

== Life ==
Stribeck studied mechanical engineering in 1880 at the Technical University of Stuttgart in 1885 and worked as a designer in Königsberg. In 1888 he became professor in Stuttgart, and 1890 Professor of Mechanical Engineering at the Technical University of Darmstadt. 1893 he took a professorship at the Dresden Technical University. In 1896 he became head of the laboratory equipment of the university.

In 1898 was head of the Stribeck Physical metallurgy department of the Technical Institute and director of the private military-industrial laboratory Zentralstelle für wissenschaftlich-technische Untersuchungen (Center for Scientific-Technical Research) in Neubabelsberg. In 1902 he described the friction coefficient in lubricated bearings, now known as the Stribeck curve.

From 1908 Stribeck worked for the Friedrich Krupp AG in Essen in 1919 at the Robert Bosch GmbH in Stuttgart. Stribeck was a college friend of the industrialist Robert Bosch, with whom he remained for a joint study at the Royal Wuerttemberg in Stuttgart Polytechnic lifelong allegiance. Stribeck was honored for his services to the Wilhelm Exner Medal proposed.

== Work ==
Richard Stribeck carried out studies in the field of tribology, focusing on friction in lubricated sliding contacts, such as journal bearings. His work lead to the development of the Stribeck Curve, a fundamental tribological concept that shows how operation conditions (in particular normal load, lubricant viscosity and lubricant entrainment velocity) influence the friction coefficient in fluid-lubricated contacts. For these contributions, he was named as one of 23 "Men of Tribology" by Duncan Dowson.

== Popular culture ==
On Tim Allen's sitcom Last Man Standing, on ABC, Allen's wife attempts to prove there are no ghosts at work by explaining how frictional contact mechanics caused a cold glass to slide spontaneously across a counter, finishing with the statement that "it's your basic Stribeck curve".
