= Bearing (mechanical) =

Mechanism to constrain relative movement to the desired motion and reduce friction

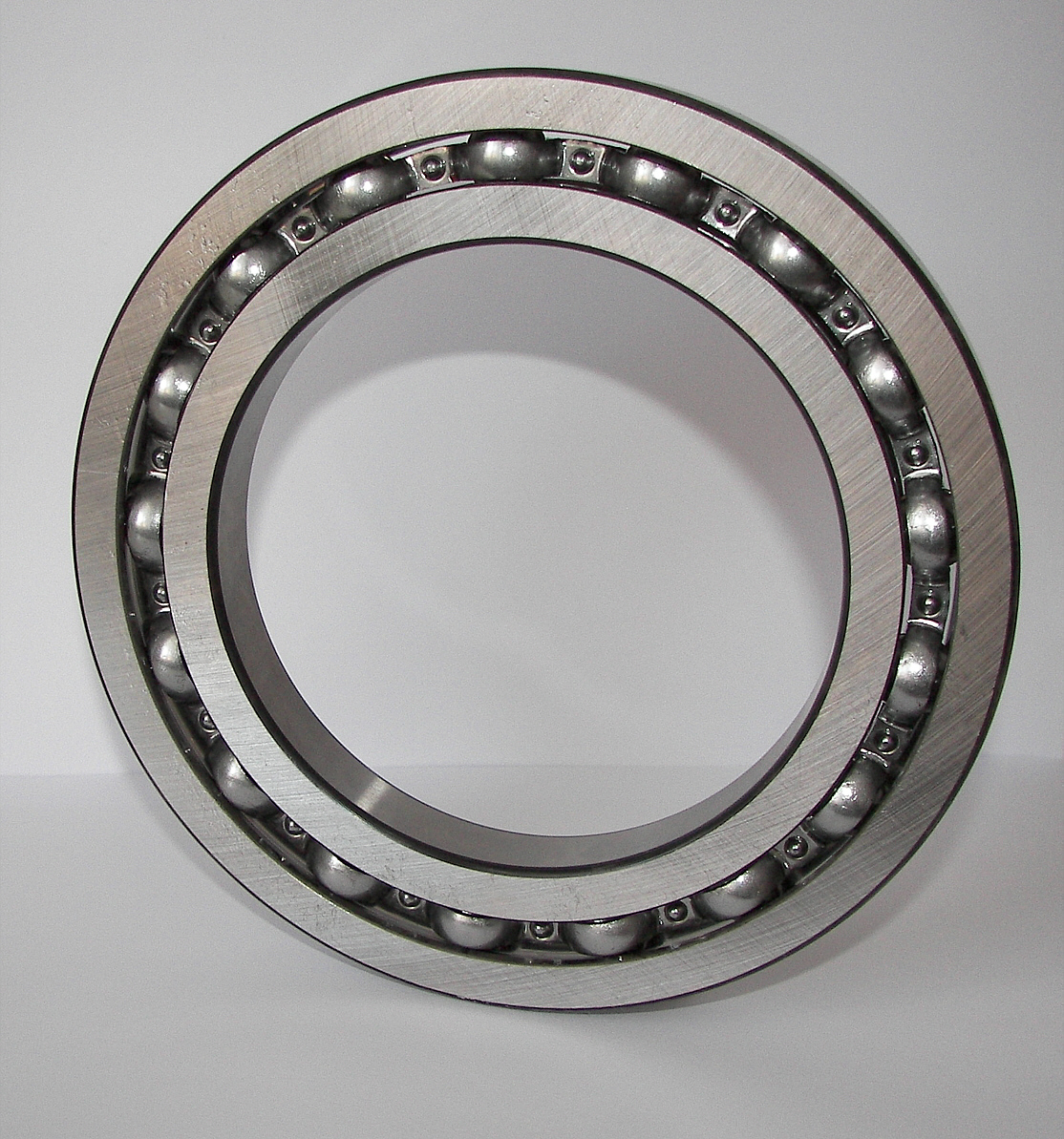
A ball bearing

A bearing is a machine element that constrains relative motion to only the desired motion and reduces friction between moving parts. The design of the bearing may, for example, provide for free linear movement of the moving part or for free rotation around a fixed axis; or, it may prevent a motion by controlling the vectors of normal forces that bear on the moving parts. Most bearings facilitate the desired motion by minimizing friction. Bearings are classified broadly according to the type of operation, the motions allowed, or the directions of the loads (forces) applied to the parts.

The term "bearing" is derived from the verb "to bear"; a bearing being a machine element that allows one part to bear (i.e., to support) another. The simplest bearings are bearing surfaces, cut or formed into a part, with varying degrees of control over the form, size, roughness, and location of the surface. Other bearings are separate devices installed into a machine or machine part. The most sophisticated bearings for the most demanding applications are very precise components; their manufacture requires some of the highest standards of current technology.

== Types of bearings ==
Rotary bearings hold rotating components such as shafts or axles within mechanical systems and transfer axial and radial loads from the source of the load to the structure supporting it. The simplest form of bearing, the plain bearing, consists of a shaft rotating in a hole. Lubrication is used to reduce friction. Lubricants come in different forms, including liquids, solids, and gases. The choice of lubricant depends on the specific application and factors such as temperature, load, and speed. In the ball bearing and roller bearing, to reduce sliding friction, rolling elements such as rollers or balls with a circular cross-section are located between the races or journals of the bearing assembly. A wide variety of bearing designs exists to allow the demands of the application to be correctly met for maximum efficiency, reliability, durability, and performance.

== History ==
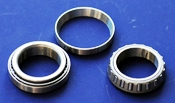
Tapered roller bearing

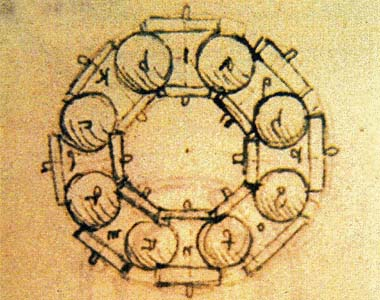
Drawing of Leonardo da Vinci (1452–1519) Study of a ball bearing

It is sometimes assumed that the invention of the rolling bearing, in the form of wooden rollers supporting– or bearing –an object being moved, predates the invention of a wheel rotating on a plain bearing; this underlies speculation that cultures such as the Ancient Egyptians used roller bearings in the form of tree trunks under sleds. There is no archaeological evidence for this sequence of technological development. The Egyptian drawings in the tomb of Djehutihotep are believed to show the process of moving massive stone blocks not with rollers but upon sledges pulled over sand which was wetted to increase its cohesion and reduce friction. There are also Egyptian drawings of plain bearings used to support the far end of hand drills.

Wheeled vehicles using plain bearings emerged between about 5000 BC and 3000 BC.

A recovered example of an early rolling-element bearing is a wooden ball bearing supporting a rotating table from the remains of the Roman Nemi ships in Lake Nemi, Italy. The wrecks were dated to 40 BC.

Leonardo da Vinci incorporated drawings of ball bearings in his design for a helicopter around the year 1500; this is the first recorded use of bearings in an aerospace design. However, Agostino Ramelli is the first to have published roller and thrust bearings sketches. An issue with the ball and roller bearings is that the balls or rollers rub against each other, causing additional friction. This can be reduced by enclosing each individual ball or roller within a cage. The captured, or caged, ball bearing was originally described by Galileo in the 17th century.

The first practical caged-roller bearing was invented in the mid-1740s by horologist John Harrison for his H3 marine timekeeper. In this timepiece, the caged bearing was only used for a very limited oscillating motion, but later on, Harrison applied a similar bearing design with a true rotational movement in a contemporaneous regulator clock.

The first patent on ball bearings was awarded to Philip Vaughan, a Welsh inventor and ironmaster in Carmarthen in 1794. His was the first modern ball-bearing design, with the ball running along a groove in the axle assembly.

Bearings played a pivotal role in the nascent Industrial Revolution, allowing the new industrial machinery to operate efficiently. For example, they were used for holding wheel and axle assemblies to greatly reduce friction compared to prior non-bearing designs.

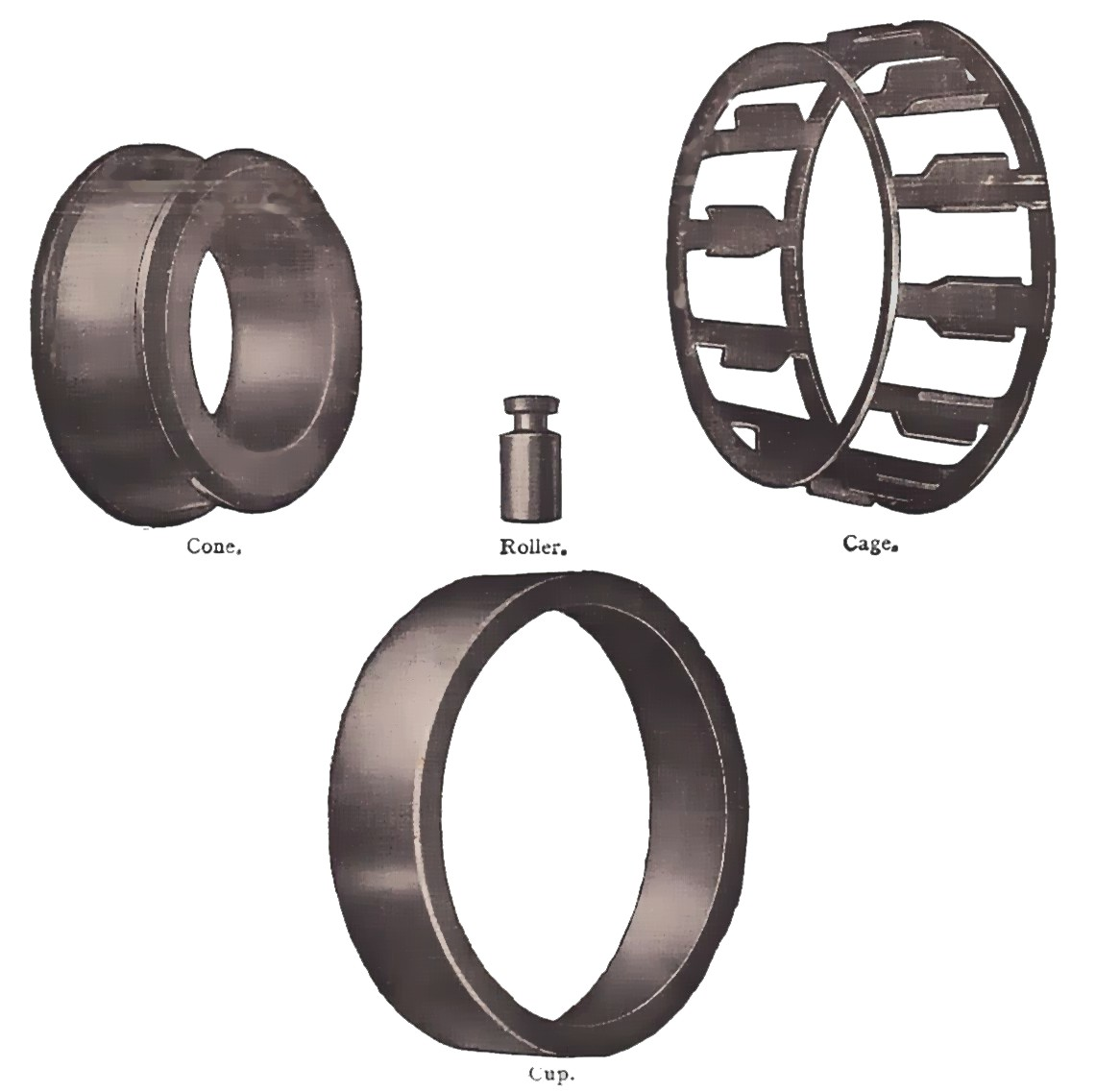
Early Timken tapered roller bearing with notched rollers

The first patent for a radial-style ball bearing was awarded to Jules Suriray, a Parisian bicycle mechanic, on 3 August 1869. The bearings were then fitted to the winning bicycle ridden by James Moore in the world's first bicycle road race, Paris-Rouen, in November 1869.

In 1883, Friedrich Fischer, founder of FAG, developed an approach for milling and grinding balls of equal size and exact roundness by means of a suitable production machine, which set the stage for the creation of an independent bearing industry. His hometown Schweinfurt later became a world-leading center for ball bearing production.

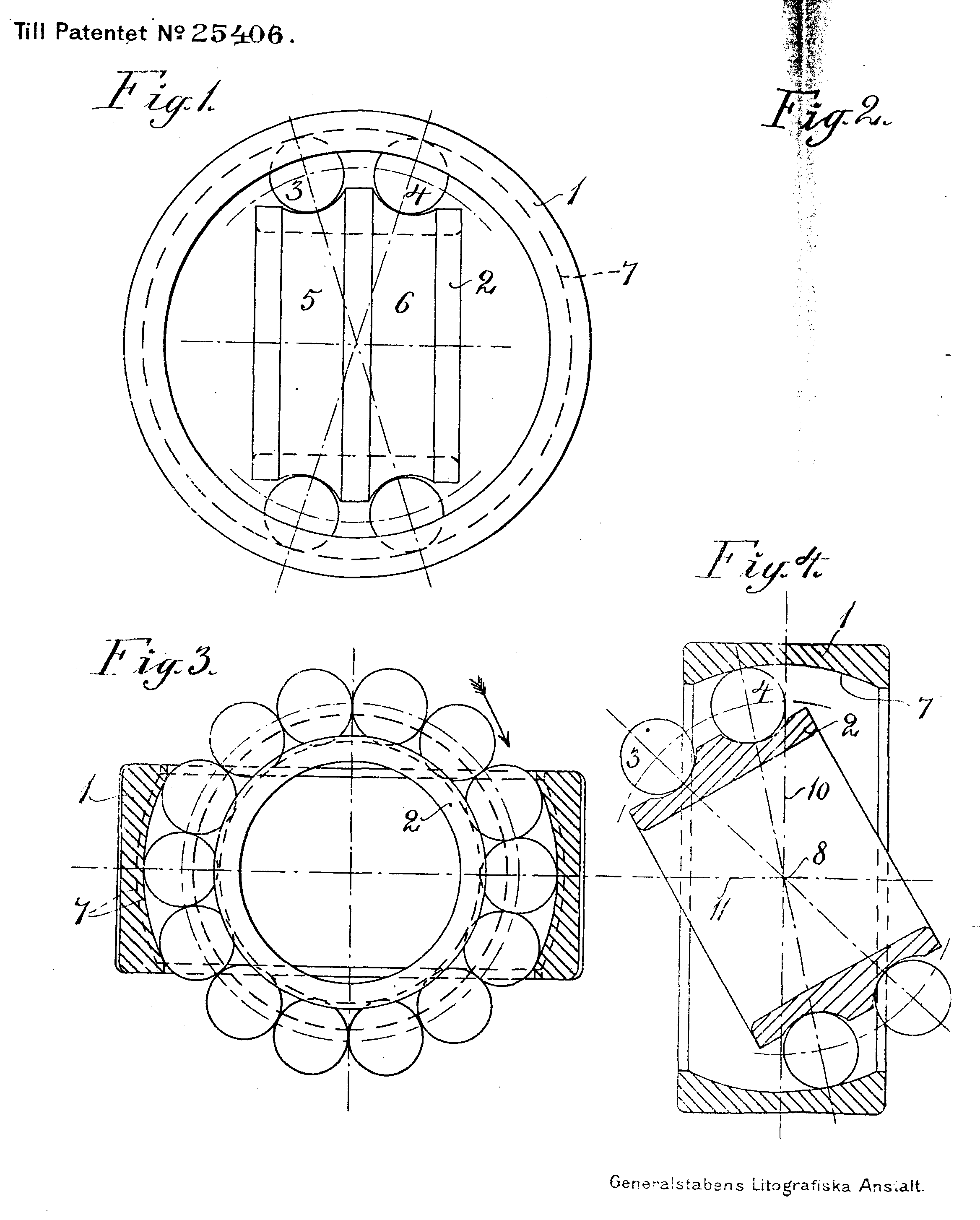
Wingquist original patent of self-aligning ball bearing

The modern, self-aligning design of ball bearing is attributed to Sven Wingquist of the SKF ball-bearing manufacturer in 1907 when he was awarded Swedish patent No. 25406 on its design.

Henry Timken, a 19th-century visionary and innovator in carriage manufacturing, patented the tapered roller bearing in 1898. The following year he formed a company to produce his innovation. Over a century, the company grew to make bearings of all types, including specialty steel bearings and an array of related products and services.

Erich Franke invented and patented the wire race bearing in 1934. His focus was on a bearing design with a cross-section as small as possible and which could be integrated into the enclosing design. After World War II, he founded with Gerhard Heydrich the company Franke & Heydrich KG (today Franke GmbH) to push the development and production of wire race bearings.

Richard Stribeck's extensive research on ball bearing steels identified the metallurgy of the commonly used 100Cr6 (AISI 52100), showing coefficient of friction as a function of pressure.

Designed in 1968 and later patented in 1972, Bishop-Wisecarver's co-founder Bud Wisecarver created vee groove bearing guide wheels, a type of linear motion bearing consisting of both an external and internal 90-degree vee angle.

In the early 1980s, Pacific Bearing's founder, Robert Schroeder, invented the first bi-material plain bearing that was interchangeable with linear ball bearings. This bearing had a metal shell (aluminum, steel or stainless steel) and a layer of Teflon-based material connected by a thin adhesive layer.

Today's ball and roller bearings are used in many applications, which include a rotating component. Examples include ultra high-speed bearings in dental drills, aerospace bearings in the Mars Rover, gearbox and wheel bearings on automobiles, flexure bearings in optical alignment systems, and air bearings used in coordinate-measuring machines.

== Design ==
=== Motions ===
Common motions permitted by bearings are:

- Radial rotation, e.g. shaft rotation;
- Linear motion, e.g. drawer;
- Spherical rotation, e.g. ball and socket joint;
- Hinge motion, e.g. door, elbow, knee.

=== Materials ===
The first plain and rolling-element bearings were wood, closely followed by bronze. Over their history, bearings have been made of many materials, including ceramic, sapphire, glass, steel, bronze, and other metals. Plastic bearings made of nylon, polyoxymethylene, polytetrafluoroethylene, and UHMWPE, among other materials, are also in use today.

Watchmakers produce "jeweled" watches using sapphire plain bearings to reduce friction, thus allowing more precise timekeeping.

Even basic materials can have impressive durability. Wooden bearings, for instance, can still be seen today in old clocks or in water mills where the water provides cooling and lubrication.

== Types ==
Animation of ball bearing (Ideal figure without a cage). The inner ring rotates and the outer ring is stationary.

By far, the most common bearing is the plain bearing, a bearing that uses surfaces in rubbing contact, often with a lubricant such as oil or graphite. A plain bearing may or may not be a discrete device. It may be nothing more than the bearing surface of a hole with a shaft passing through it, or of a planar surface that bears another (in these cases, not a discrete device); or it may be a layer of bearing metal either fused to the substrate (semi-discrete) or in the form of a separable sleeve (discrete). With suitable lubrication, plain bearings often give acceptable accuracy, life, and friction at minimal cost. Therefore, they are very widely used.

However, there are many applications where a more suitable bearing can improve efficiency, accuracy, service intervals, reliability, speed of operation, size, weight, and costs of purchasing and operating machinery.

Thus, many types of bearings have varying shapes, materials, lubrication, principle of operation, and so on.

There are at least 6 common types of bearing, each of which operates on a different principle:

- Plain bearing, consisting of a shaft rotating in a hole. There are several specific styles: bushing, journal bearing, sleeve bearing, rifle bearing, composite bearing;
- Rolling-element bearings, whose performance does not depend on avoiding or reducing friction between two surfaces but employs a different principle to achieve low external friction: the rolling motion of an intermediate element in between the surfaces which bear the axial or radial load. Classified as either:
  - Ball bearing, in which the rolling elements are spherical balls;
  - Roller bearing, in which the rolling elements are cylindrical rollers, linearly-tapered (conical) rollers, rollers with a curved taper (such as so-called spherical rollers), or gears;
- Jewel bearing, a plain bearing in which one of the bearing surfaces is made of an ultrahard glassy jewel material such as sapphire to reduce friction and wear;
- Fluid bearing, a noncontact bearing in which the load is supported by a gas or liquid (i.e. air bearing);
- Magnetic bearing, in which the load is supported by a magnetic field;
- Flexure bearing, in which the motion is supported by a load element which bends.

The following table summarizes the notable characteristics of each of these bearing types.

Type	Description	Friction	Stiffness	Speed	Life	Notes
Plain bearing	Rubbing surfaces, usually with lubricant; some bearings use pumped lubrication and behave similarly to fluid bearings.	Depends on materials and construction, PTFE has a coefficient of friction ≈0.05–0.35, depending upon fillers added	Good, provided wear is low, but some slack is normally present	Low to very high	Low to very high – depends upon application and lubrication	Widely used, relatively high friction, suffers from stiction in some applications. Depending upon the application, the lifetime can be higher or lower than rolling element bearings.
Rolling element bearing	Ball or rollers contact both rotating and stationary surfaces which rotate rather than rub	Rolling coefficient of friction with steel can be ≈0.005 (adding resistance due to seals, packed grease, preload and misalignment can increase friction to as much as 0.125)	Good, but some slack is usually present	Moderate to high (often requires cooling)	Moderate to high (depends on lubrication, often requires maintenance)	Used for higher moment loads than plain bearings with lower friction
Jewel bearing	Off-center bearing rolls in seating	Low	Low due to flexing	Low	Adequate (requires maintenance)	Mainly used in low-load, high precision work such as clocks. Jewel bearings may be very small.
Fluid bearing	Fluid is forced between two faces and held in by edge seal	Zero friction at zero speed, low	Very high	Very high (usually limited to a few hundred feet per second at/by seal)	Virtually infinite in some applications, may wear at startup/shutdown in some cases. Often negligible maintenance.	Can fail quickly due to grit or dust or other contaminants. Maintenance free in continuous use. Can handle very large loads with low friction.
Magnetic bearing	Faces of bearing are kept separate by magnets (electromagnets or eddy currents)	Zero friction at zero speed, but constant power for levitation, eddy currents are often induced when movement occurs, but may be negligible if magnetic field is quasi-static	Low	No practical limit	Indefinite. Maintenance free. (with electromagnets)	Active magnetic bearings (AMB) need considerable power. Electrodynamic bearings (EDB) do not require external power.
Flexure bearing	Material flexes to give and constrain movement	Very low	Low	Very high.	Very high or low depending on materials and strain in application. Usually maintenance free.	Limited range of movement, no backlash, extremely smooth motion
Composite bearing	Plain bearing shape with PTFE liner on the interface between bearing and shaft with a laminated metal backing. PTFE acts as a lubricant.	PTFE and use of filters to dial in friction as necessary for friction control.	Good depending on laminated metal backing	Low to very high	Very high; PTFE and fillers ensure wear and corrosion resistance	Widely used, controls friction, reduces stick slip, PTFE reduces static friction

== Characteristics ==
=== Friction ===
Reducing friction in bearings is often important for efficiency, to reduce wear and to facilitate extended use at high speeds and to avoid overheating and premature failure of the bearing. Essentially, a bearing can reduce friction by virtue of its shape, by its material, or by introducing and containing a fluid between surfaces or by separating the surfaces with an electromagnetic field.

- Shape: gains advantage usually by using spheres or rollers, or by forming flexure bearings.
- Material: exploits the nature of the bearing material used. (An example would be using plastics that have low surface friction)
- Lubrication: exploits the low viscosity of a layer of fluid, such as a lubricant or a pressurized medium, to keep the two solid parts from touching or to reduce the normal force between them. Depending on the bearing design, this can operate in hydrodynamic or hydrostatic regimes, both of which create a stable fluid film that supports the load and minimizes friction.
- Fluid: exploits the low viscosity of a layer of fluid, such as a lubricant or a pressurized medium, to keep the two solid parts from touching or to reduce the normal force between them. Depending on the bearing design, this can operate in hydrodynamic or hydrostatic regimes, both of which create a stable fluid film that supports the load and minimizes friction.
- Fields: exploits electromagnetic fields, such as magnetic fields, to keep solid parts from touching.
- Air pressure: exploits air pressure to keep solid parts from touching.

Combinations of these can even be employed within the same bearing. An example is where the cage is made of plastic, and it separates the rollers/balls, which reduce friction by their shape and finish.

=== Loads ===
Bearing design varies depending on the size and directions of the forces required to support. Forces can be predominately radial, axial (thrust bearings), or bending moments perpendicular to the main axis.

=== Speeds ===
Different bearing types have different operating speed limits. Speed is typically specified as maximum relative surface speeds, often specified ft/s or m/s. Rotational bearings typically describe performance in terms of the product DN where D is the mean diameter (often in mm) of the bearing and N is the rotation rate in revolutions per minute.

Generally, there is considerable speed range overlap between bearing types. Plain bearings typically handle only lower speeds, rolling element bearings are faster, followed by fluid bearings and finally magnetic bearings which are limited ultimately by centripetal force overcoming material strength.

=== Play ===
Some applications apply bearing loads from varying directions and accept only limited play or "slop" as the applied load changes. One source of motion is gaps or "play" in the bearing. For example, a 10 mm shaft in a 12 mm hole has 2 mm play.

Allowable play varies greatly depending on the use. As an example, a wheelbarrow wheel supports radial and axial loads. Axial loads may be hundreds of newtons force left or right, and it is typically acceptable for the wheel to wobble by as much as 10 mm under the varying load. In contrast, a lathe may position a cutting tool to ±0.002 mm using a ball lead screw held by rotating bearings. The bearings support axial loads of thousands of newtons in either direction and must hold the ball lead screw to ±0.002 mm across that range of loads

=== Stiffness ===
Stiffness is the amount that the gap varies when the load on the bearing changes, distinct from the friction of the bearing.

A second source of motion is elasticity in the bearing itself. For example, the balls in a ball bearing are like stiff rubber and under load deform from a round to a slightly flattened shape. The race is also elastic and develops a slight dent where the ball presses on it.

The stiffness of a bearing is how the distance between the parts separated by the bearing varies with the applied load. With rolling element bearings, this is due to the strain of the ball and race. With fluid bearings, it is due to how the pressure of the fluid varies with the gap (when correctly loaded, fluid bearings are typically stiffer than rolling element bearings).

== Lubrication ==
Some bearings use a thick grease for lubrication, which is pushed into the gaps between the bearing surfaces, also known as packing. The grease is held in place by a plastic, leather, or rubber gasket (also called a gland) that covers the inside and outside edges of the bearing race to keep the grease from escaping. Bearings may also be packed with other materials. Historically, the wheels on railroad cars used sleeve bearings packed with waste or loose scraps of cotton or wool fiber soaked in oil, then later used solid pads of cotton.

Bearings can be lubricated by a ring oiler, a metal ring that rides loosely on the central rotating shaft of the bearing. The ring hangs down into a chamber containing lubricating oil. As the bearing rotates, viscous adhesion draws oil up the ring and onto the shaft, where the oil migrates into the bearing to lubricate it. Excess oil is flung off and collects in the pool again.

A rudimentary form of lubrication is splash lubrication. Some machines contain a pool of lubricant in the bottom, with gears partially immersed in the liquid, or crank rods that can swing down into the pool as the device operates. The spinning wheels fling oil into the air around them, while the crank rods slap at the surface of the oil, splashing it randomly on the engine's interior surfaces. Some small internal combustion engines specifically contain special plastic flinger wheels which randomly scatter oil around the interior of the mechanism.

For high-speed and high-power machines, a loss of lubricant can result in rapid bearing heating and damage due to friction. Also, in dirty environments, the oil can become contaminated with dust or debris, increasing friction. In these applications, a fresh supply of lubricant can be continuously supplied to the bearing and all other contact surfaces, and the excess can be collected for filtration, cooling, and possibly reuse. Pressure oiling is commonly used in large and complex internal combustion engines in parts of the engine where directly splashed oil cannot reach, such as up into overhead valve assemblies. High-speed turbochargers also typically require a pressurized oil system to cool the bearings and keep them from burning up due to the heat from the turbine.

Composite bearings are designed with a self-lubricating polytetrafluorethylene (PTFE) liner with a laminated metal backing. The PTFE liner offers consistent, controlled friction as well as durability, whilst the metal backing ensures the composite bearing is robust and capable of withstanding high loads and stresses throughout its long life. Its design also makes it lightweight-one tenth the weight of a traditional rolling element bearing.

== Mounting ==
There are many methods of mounting bearings, usually involving an interference fit. When press fitting or shrink fitting a bearing into a bore or onto a shaft, it's important to keep the housing bore and shaft outer diameter to very close limits, which can involve one or more counterboring operations, several facing operations, and drilling, tapping, and threading operations. Alternatively, an interference fit can also be achieved with the addition of a tolerance ring.

== Service life ==
The service life of the bearing is affected by many factors not controlled by the bearing manufacturers. For example, bearing mounting, temperature, exposure to external environment, lubricant cleanliness, and electrical currents through bearings. High frequency PWM inverters can induce electric currents in a bearing, which can be suppressed by the use of ferrite chokes. The temperature and terrain of the micro-surface will determine the amount of friction by touching solid parts. Certain elements and fields reduce friction while increasing speeds. Strength and mobility help determine the load the bearing type can carry. Alignment factors can play a damaging role in wear and tear, yet overcome by computer aid signaling and non-rubbing bearing types, such as magnetic levitation or air field pressure.

Fluid and magnetic bearings can have practically indefinite service lives. In practice, fluid bearings support high loads in hydroelectric plants that have been in nearly continuous service since about 1900 and show no signs of wear.

Rolling element bearing life is determined by load, temperature, maintenance, lubrication, material defects, contamination, handling, installation and other factors. These factors can all have a significant effect on bearing life. For example, the service life of bearings in one application was extended dramatically by changing how the bearings were stored before installation and use, as vibrations during storage caused lubricant failure even when the only load on the bearing was its own weight; the resulting damage is often false brinelling. Bearing life is statistical: several samples of a given bearing will often exhibit a bell curve of service life, with a few samples showing significantly better or worse life. Bearing life varies because microscopic structure and contamination vary greatly even where macroscopically they seem identical.

Bearings life is commonly specified in terms of an "L10" (sometimes "B10") value, the duration by which ten percent of the bearings in that application can be expected to have failed due to classical fatigue failure (and not any other mode of failure such as lubrication starvation, wrong mounting etc.), or, alternatively, the duration at which ninety percent will still be operating. The L10/B10 life of the bearing is theoretical, and may not represent service life of the bearing. Bearings are also rated using the C_{0} (static loading) value. This is the basic load rating as a reference, and not an actual load value.

For plain bearings, some materials give a much longer life than others. Some of the John Harrison clocks still operate after hundreds of years because of the lignum vitae wood employed in their construction, whereas his metal clocks are seldom run due to potential wear.

Flexure bearings rely on elastic properties of a material. Flexure bearings bend a piece of material repeatedly. Some materials fail after repeated bending, even at low loads, but careful material selection and bearing design can make flexure bearing life indefinite.

Although long bearing life is often desirable, it is sometimes not necessary. Harris 2001 describes a bearing for a rocket motor oxygen pump that gave several hours life, far in excess of the several tens of minutes needed.

Depending on the customized specifications (backing material and PTFE compounds), composite bearings can operate up to 30 years without maintenance.

For bearings which are used in oscillating applications, customized approaches to calculate L10/B10 are used.

Many bearings require periodic maintenance to prevent premature failure, but others require little maintenance. The latter include various kinds of polymer, fluid and magnetic bearings, as well as rolling-element bearings that are described with terms including sealed bearing and sealed for life. These contain seals to keep the dirt out and the grease in. They work successfully in many applications, providing maintenance-free operation. Some applications cannot use them effectively.

Nonsealed bearings often have a grease fitting, for periodic lubrication with a grease gun, or an oil cup for periodic filling with oil. Before the 1970s, sealed bearings were not encountered on most machinery, and oiling and greasing were a more common activity than they are today. For example, automotive chassis used to require "lube jobs" nearly as often as engine oil changes, but today's car chassis are mostly sealed for life. From the late 1700s through the mid-1900s, industry relied on many workers called oilers to lubricate machinery frequently with oil cans.

Factory machines today usually have lube systems, in which a central pump serves periodic charges of oil or grease from a reservoir through lube lines to the various lube points in the machine's bearing surfaces, bearing journals, pillow blocks, and so on. The timing and number of such lube cycles is controlled by the machine's computerized control, such as PLC or CNC, as well as by manual override functions when occasionally needed. This automated process is how all modern CNC machine tools and many other factory machines are lubricated. Similar lube systems are also used on nonautomated machines, in which case there is a hand pump that a machine operator is supposed to pump once daily (for machines in constant use) or once weekly. These are called one-shot systems from their chief selling point: one pull on one handle to lube the whole machine, instead of a dozen pumps of an alemite gun or oil can in a dozen different positions around the machine.

The oiling system inside a modern automotive or truck engine is similar in concept to the lube systems mentioned above, except that oil is pumped continuously. Much of this oil flows through passages drilled or cast into the engine block and cylinder heads, escaping through ports directly onto bearings and squirting elsewhere to provide an oil bath. The oil pump simply pumps constantly, and any excess pumped oil continuously escapes through a relief valve back into the sump.

Many bearings in high-cycle industrial operations need periodic lubrication and cleaning, and many require occasional adjustment, such as pre-load adjustment, to minimize the effects of wear.

Bearing life is often much better when the bearing is kept clean and well-lubricated. However, many applications make good maintenance difficult. One example is bearings in the conveyor of a rock crusher are exposed continually to hard abrasive particles. Cleaning is of little use because cleaning is expensive, yet the bearing is contaminated again as soon as the conveyor resumes operation. Thus, a good maintenance program might lubricate the bearings frequently but not include any disassembly for cleaning. The frequent lubrication, by its nature, provides a limited kind of cleaning action by displacing older (grit-filled) oil or grease with a fresh charge, which itself collects grit before being displaced by the next cycle. Another example are bearings in wind turbines, which makes maintenance difficult since the nacelle is placed high up in the air in strong wind areas. In addition, the turbine does not always run and is subjected to different operating behavior in different weather conditions, which makes proper lubrication a challenge.

== See also ==
- Needle roller bearing – Type of roller bearing which uses long, thin cylinders as rollers
- Rolamite – Low friction bearing technology
- Slewing bearing – Rotational support element for directional alignment

Manufacturers:

- Timken
- SKF
- Schaeffler Group
- NSK
- NTN
- Koyo Seiko
- Nachi-Fujikoshi
- MinebeaMitsumi
