= Composite bearing =

Bearing made from a combination of materials

A composite bearing is a bearing made from a combination of materials such as a resin reinforced with fibre and this may also include friction reducing lubricants and ingredients.

A composite bearing is not a polytetrafluoroethylene (PTFE) bearing in a carrier of another material, this is a PTFE bearing in a carrier. The plain composite bearing can be lighter than a rolling element bearing but this is not always a feature as some composites are extremely dense which results in lower porosity. Another distinctive feature of the composite bearing is its lightweight design—it can be one-tenth the weight of the traditional rolling element bearing. No heavy metals are used in its manufacture.

Composite bearings can be customized to meet the individual requirements of many applications, such as wear- or high-temperature resistance. The weight of the composite bearing can vary depending on its backing. The PTFE liner can be applied on steel or aluminum backing. Through filler compounds, various properties of the composite bearing, such as resistance to creep, wear and electrical conductivity, can be optimized.

== Technology ==
A composite bearing is a bearing made from a composite material, such as fibre reinforced resin, or plastic. These will often contain friction reducing ingredients such as PTFE but this is not the only material for reducing friction and wear and lubricating when the bearing is running dry (without external lubricants). PTFE in itself is not a good bearing material as it is inherently soft and deforms under pressure, so the use of PTFE as a liner is not as beneficial as having PTFE combined into a solid and strong matrix of resin and fibre. A composite bearing is a bearing with a liner of PTFE compound and a metal backing. PTFE is a fluorocarbon solid, as it is a high-molecular-weight compound consisting wholly of carbon and fluorine. PTFE is hydrophobic: neither water nor water-containing substances wet PTFE. Components engineered with PTFE offer consistent, controlled friction over their lifetime.

PTFE is often used as a non-stick coating for pans and other cookware. It is very non-reactive, partly because of the strength of carbon-fluorine bonds, so it is often used in containers and pipe work for reactive and corrosive chemicals. PTFE can also be used as a machinery lubricant to reduce friction, wear and energy consumption.

PTFE is self-lubricating, so wet lubrication and replenishment of lubrication is not necessary but can be added if a reduction of the coefficient of friction or wear is demanded depending on the application.

== Application and uses ==
=== Automotive ===
Automotive manufacturers are striving to meet growing demand for lighter and more fuel-efficient vehicles and evaluate components and materials used in various car applications. Composite bearings are useful components in automotive design and are used in a range of applications throughout the car, from the powertrain to the car interior. In addition to enhancing automotive performance, composite bearings’ split ring design allows them to be press fitted, without the need for adhesive or excessive assembly force.

==== Steering Yoke ====
The steering rack has a bearing situated at the yoke - the interface between the steering rack and the steering column. The yoke is designed to prevent the separation of the steering rack from the steering column, whilst allowing the steering rack to move freely the in transverse direction. The yoke determines a motorist's ability to feel the road surface and the vehicle's maneuverability. With their PTFE liner, composite bearings reduce friction in the steering yoke.

==== Belt Tensioner ====
A belt tensioner is a device designed to maintain tension in the engine's timing belt. There is a spring device in the belt tensioner where the bearing is located. The spring device oscillates back and forth at 2° for about 60 cycles per minute.

Composite bearings ensure an appropriate and consistent level of torque and damping to maintain the correct tension in the drive belt while the engine is in operation.

==== Door Hinges ====
In door hinges, bearings sit between the hinge pin and housing to ensure smooth movement of the door when it is opened and closed by passengers. Composite bearings are used in a number of automotive hinge systems due to their durability under high loads and corrosion resistance.

Bearings also play a role in obtaining a quality paint finish on the car. Composite bearings’ PTFE compound liners are conductive and can transfer electricity to the hinges to facilitate the electrostatic painting process.

They are also hydrophobic and repel paint, minimizing the risk of excess droplets impairing the paintwork finish.

==== Seat Mechanism ====
In adjustable seats, seat mechanisms facilitate movement. A bearing fits between the linkage and the pin and is designed to provide correct levels of torque. Composite bearings can be used in the pivot points in seat components to maintain torque, allowing passengers to adjust their seat easily and smoothly for a comfortable experience.

=== Bicycle ===
Bicycle designers strive to reduce weight and increase the performance of their bicycles without sacrificing quality and strength. The bicycle industry is demanding lightweight, high-performance products with maintenance-free components.

==== Fork ====
The bicycle fork enhances rider comfort in rough terrain by enabling the shaft attached to the bicycle frame to slide within the housing attached to the wheels. The bearing sits between the shaft and housing. The liner of PTFE within composite bearings enhances shock absorption as it acts as a cushion, while the lightweight metal backing helps to reduce bicycle weight.

==== Shock Absorbers ====
Front shocks, key components in suspension bicycles, are designed to reduce the impact of bumps and jolts for a smoother ride. The bearing sits between the inner shaft and outer housing to facilitate smooth movement in the mechanism for optimum performance. Composite bearings with a PTFE liner act as a cushion, absorbing excess vibrations to further enhance the movement.

==== Headsets ====
Composite bearings can be used in the headset. Composite bearing can be lightweight to support weight reduction efforts across the overall bicycle.

==== Pedal and Brake Pivots ====
The low friction that bearings can provide helps to reduce “stick slip”, avoiding any undesirable jerking motion. Pedals rotate on bearings that connect the spindle to the end of the crank and the body of the pedal.

==== Derailleurs ====
The derailleur is used in the bicycle's gear system. The change in cable tension to switch gears moves a chain from side to side, "derailing" the chain onto different sprockets and, therefore, different gears.

=== Solar ===
Solar has become a viable source of energy. According to the International Energy Agency, Concentrated Solar Power (CSP) could be responsible for up to 11.5% of global electricity production by 2050. The life expectancy of a CSP plant could be up to 40 years and energy companies are looking for components that will last the lifetime of a CSP plant.

==== Solar Tracking System ====
Concentrating Solar Power (CSP) plants use concentrated solar radiation as a high-temperature energy source to produce electrical power. A solar tracker is a device for concentrating solar reflectors toward the sun. Bearings are used in the pivot points to both support the structure in a parabolic trough and to rotate the mirrors on heliostats (solar tower).

Composite bearings can be used in the parabolic trough and solar power tower to rotate the mirrors. They can withstand the loads in CSP applications, are weather and corrosion resistant and also offer low and constant friction (no stick-slip effect) over the mechanism's life cycle.

=== Piston Pumps in off-highway Construction Equipment ===
Off-highway construction equipment from excavators to simple loaders employs hydraulic transmission systems as a primary source of motion. Hydraulic piston pumps, mechanical devices used to convert mechanical energy into hydraulic energy, are typically used in off-highway construction equipment and driven by an electric motor or a combustion engine.

Bearings are mounted on the piston pump shaft, which transfers drive torque to the cylinder block. The bearing's role is to ensure smooth movement and reduce energy use. Composite bearings’ self-lubricating PTFE layer allows consistent, low friction in pump mechanisms for minimal energy use and reduced maintenance requirements.

== See also ==
- Bearing (mechanical)
- Ball bearing
- Needle roller bearing
- Slewing bearing
- Race (bearing)
- Pillow block bearing
