= Swivel =

Connection that allows an object to rotate horizontally or vertically

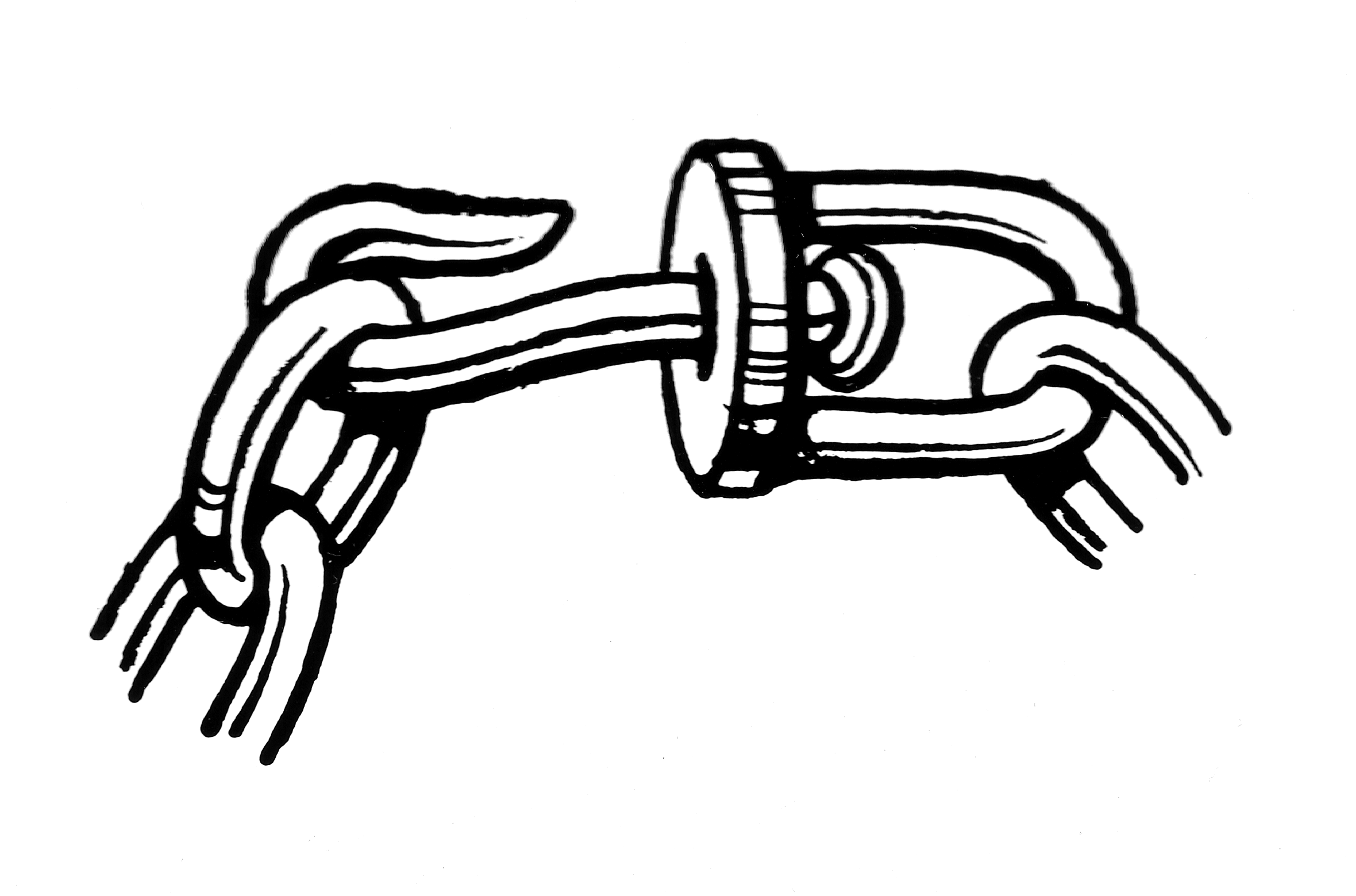
A swivel in a chain link

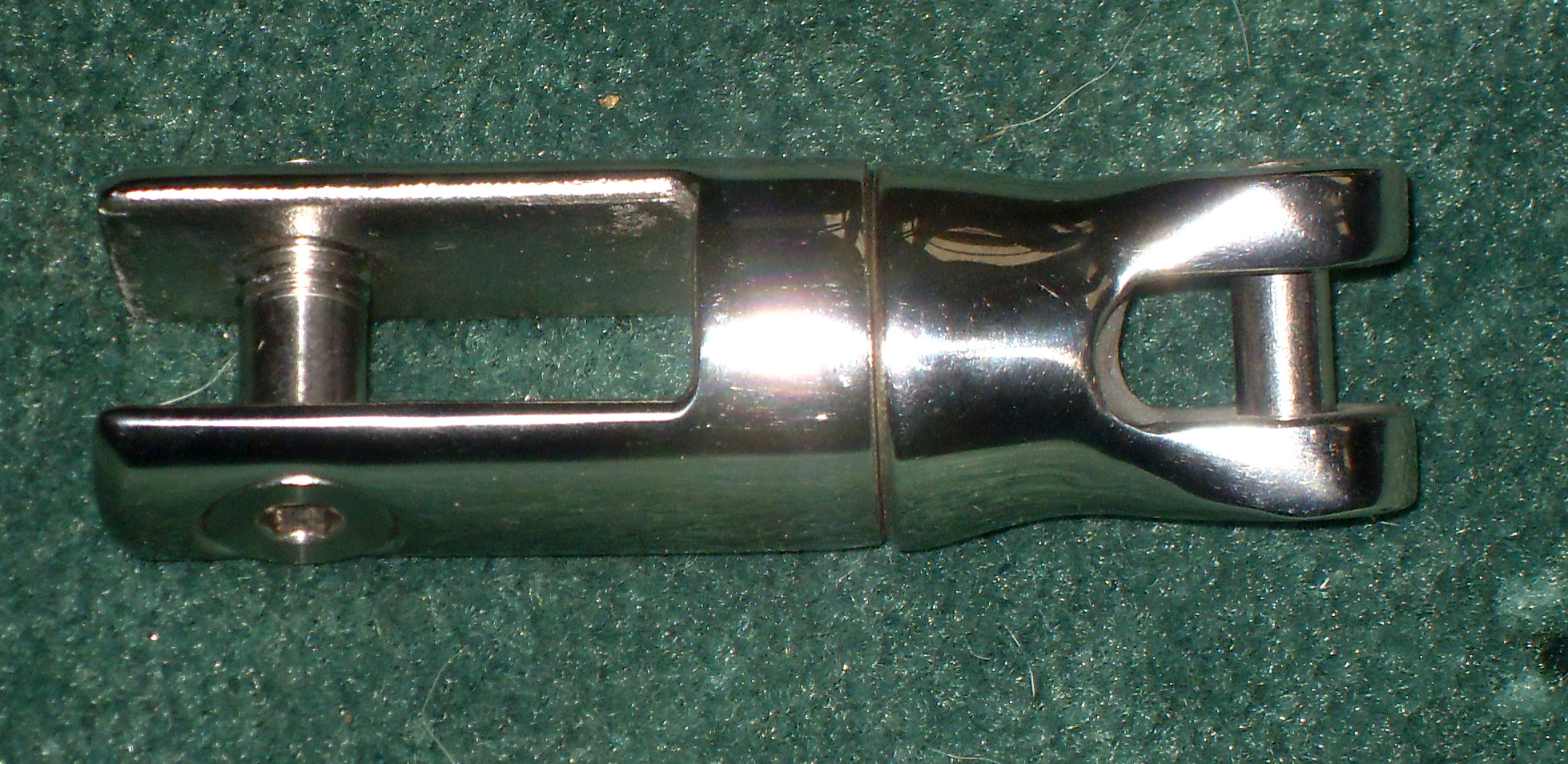
Stainless steel anchor swivel

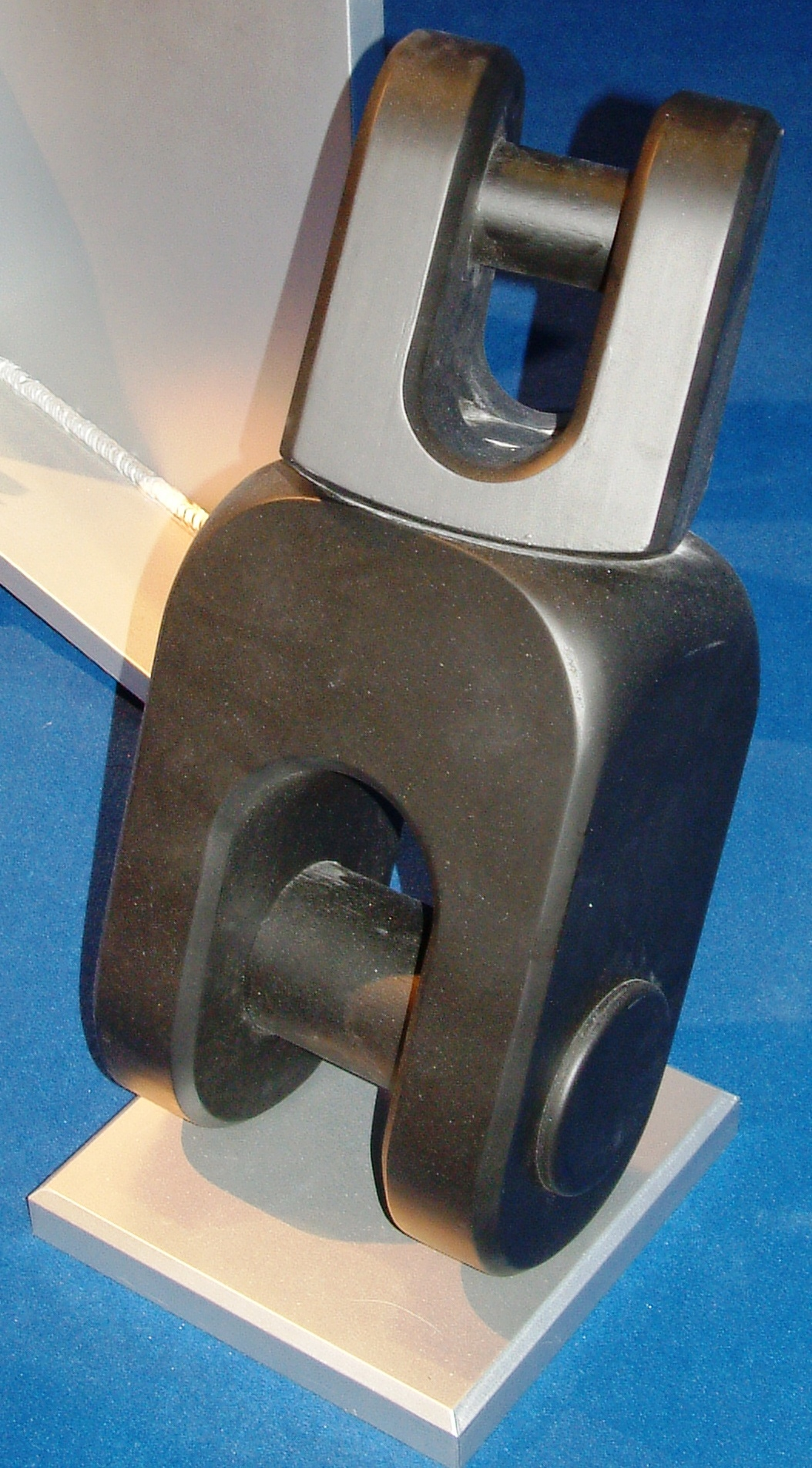
A swivel in a link

A swivel is a connection that allows the connected object, such as a gun, chair, swivel caster, or an anchor rode to rotate horizontally or vertically.

== Swivel designs ==
A common design for a swivel is a cylindrical rod that can turn freely within a support structure. The rod is usually prevented from slipping out by a nut, washer or thickening of the rod. The device can be attached to the ends of the rod or the center. Another common design is a sphere that is able to rotate within a support structure. The device is attached to the sphere. A third design is a hollow cylindrical rod that has a rod that is slightly smaller than its inside diameter inside of it. They are prevented from coming apart by flanges. The device may be attached to either end.

A swivel joint for a pipe is often a threaded connection in between which at least one of the pipes is curved, often at an angle of 45 or 90 degrees. The connection is tightened enough to be water- or air-tight and then tightened further so that it is in the correct position.

== Anchor rode swivel ==
Swivels are also used in the nautical sector as an element of the anchor rode and in a boat mooring systems. With yachts, the swivel is most commonly used between the anchor and chain. There is a school of thought that anchor swivels should not be connected to the anchor itself, but should be somewhere in the chain rode.

The anchor swivel is expected to fulfill two purposes:

- If the boat swings in a circle the chain may become twisted and the swivel may alleviate this problem.
- If the anchor comes up turned around, some swivels may right it.

=== Concerns ===
The biggest concern about anchor swivels is that they might introduce a weak link to the rode.

- With most swivels the shaft is nice and tidily embedded in the other half of the swivel as in the example of the stainless steel anchor swivel shown here. When used in marine applications, and worse in tropical climates, this is a cause for corrosion, even in stainless steel.
  - The chromium in stainless steel creates a passivation layer on the surface that protects the steel from rusting. In low oxygen situations and/or warm water this passivation layer breaks down and corrosion will set in. Low oxygen will occur in crevasses which stay wet (cracks, welds, shackle threads, keel bolts, etc.) or confined spaces (swivel shafts, etc.). Corrosion may also happen internally. Welding may cause the chromium to bind with carbon and thus indirectly lead to corrosion.
- In come cases the shaft is threaded with a nut welded onto it to hold the two bits together. First of all, a threaded bar is inherently weaker than a solid bar of the same diameter. Then there is the issue of the welds not holding.
- When a boat swings on a well-embedded anchor, this can cause strong lateral loads on the swivel, causing its jaws to be pried open - thus disconnecting the chain from the swivel. Hence the above advice from Rocna.
- Some boating schools teach that the anchor should be pulled tight against the bow roller by the windlass. This causes stress to the weakest link (swivel) as the vessel pounds through waves and can thus speed up failure.

== See also ==
- Slewing bearing

== Bibliography ==
- Blackwell, Alex & Daria; Happy Hooking – the Art of Anchoring, 2008, 2011, 2019 White Seahorse; ISBN 978-1795717410
- Hinz, Earl R.; The Complete Book of Anchoring and Mooring, Rev. 2d ed., 1986, 1994, 2001 Cornell Maritime Press; ISBN 0-87033-539-1
