= Schaeffler Group =

German bearings manufacturer

Schaeffler AG

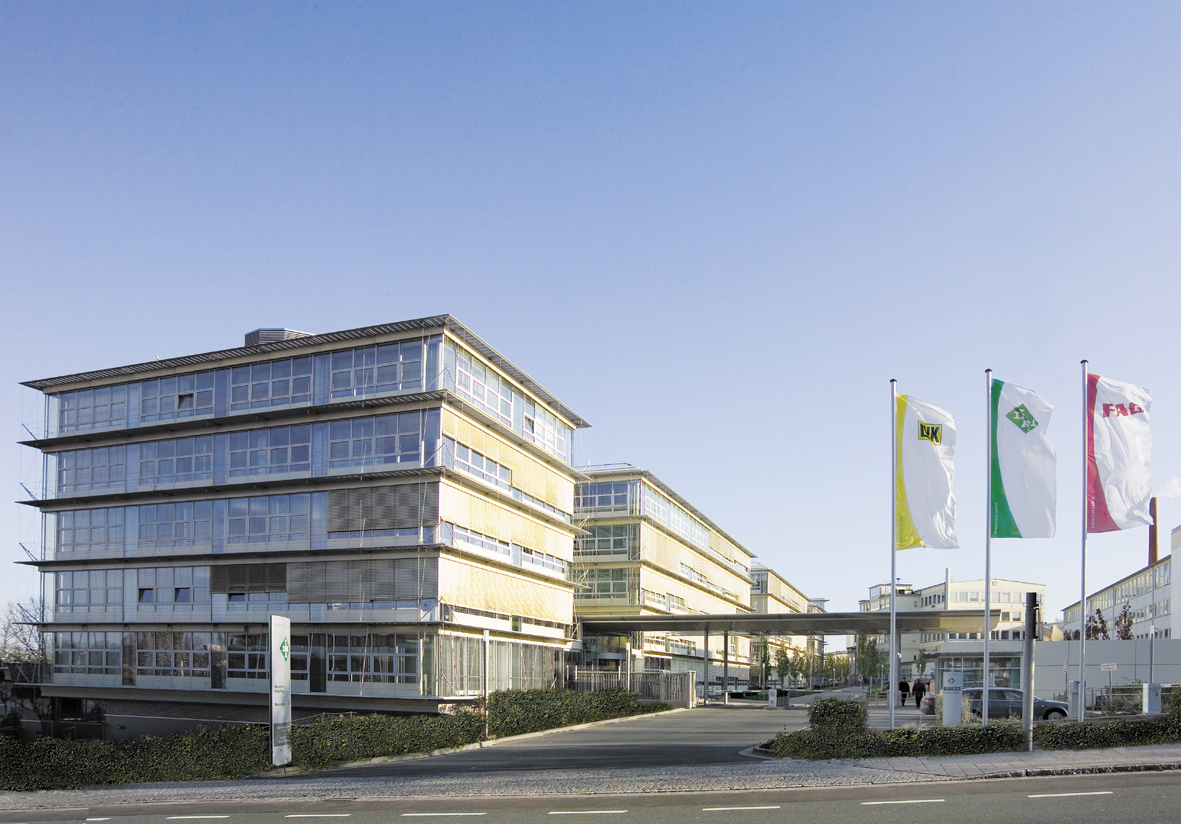
- Headquarters in Herzogenaurach, Germany
- Type: Public
- Traded as: FWB: SHA0; MDAX
- Industry: Automotive, aerospace, industrial
- Founded: 1946; 80 years ago
- Founders: Wilhelm Schaeffler; Georg Schaeffler
- Headquarters: Herzogenaurach, Germany
- Area served: Worldwide
- Key people: Klaus Rosenfeld (CEO)
- Revenue: €23.492 billion (2025)
- Operating income: €295 million (2025)
- Net income: −€392 million (2025)
- Total assets: €21.028 billion (2025)
- Number of employees: 110,753 (2025)
- Website: www.schaeffler.com

Schaeffler Technologies AG & Co. KG, also known as the Schaeffler Group (Schaeffler-Gruppe in German), is a German manufacturer of rolling element bearings for automotive, aerospace and industrial uses, including the FAG brand. It was founded in 1946 by brothers Dr. Wilhelm and Dr.-Ing. E. h. Georg Schaeffler.

As of 2021, the firm was majority owned by Maria-Elizabeth Schaeffler-Thumann and her son Georg F. W. Schaeffler through a series of holding companies. These holding companies, controlled by the Schaeffler family, also own controlling interests in Continental AG and Vitesco Technologies.

Schaeffler Group owns the brands INA, FAG, and LuK. In Germany, these main brands are marketed by Schaeffler Technologies AG & Co. KG and LuK GmbH & Co. oHG.

Schaeffler has an Indian subsidiary, Schaeffler India, which is publicly listed on the National Stock Exchange of India and the Bombay Stock Exchange.

== History ==
=== 1883-1939 ===
In 1883, Friedrich Fischer of Schweinfurt designed a machine to allow steel balls to be ground to an absolutely round state for the first time – and in large volumes. On 29 July 1905, the FAG brand was registered with the patent office in Berlin. The registered trademark FAG is an acronym for "Fischer's Automatische Gussstahlkugelfabrik," or "Fischer's Automatic Steel Ball Factory."

=== Third Reich ===
In 1939, Certified Public Accountant Wilhelm Schaeffler, an employee of the Dresdner Bank, "acquired" Davistan AG, a Jewish founded textiles company 30 percent below value; the owner, Ernst Frank, had bankrupted in April 1933, because of the boycott and fled Germany. The company was located in Katscher in Oberschlesien. In 1941, Wilhelm Schaeffler joined the NSDAP. In 1942, Wilhelm Schaeffler changed the Jewish-sounding name of the company to Wilhelm Schaeffler AG and his brother, Georg Schaeffler bought 25 percent of the company by the end of 1942. During World War II, weapons inspectors were urgently looking for further production sites in Upper Silesia, which was barely accessible to Allied bomber units and by June 1943 the Willi Scheffler AG was on a planning list and threatened to close. Some civilian production companies managed to avoid their shutdown by turning to weapons production or ensuring high productivity and lowest possible consumption of raw materials and finished parts. In the summer of 1943, Wilhelm Schaeffler founded a limited partnership for the production of armaments and textiles (dropping devices for the air force, fire bombs, needle bearings for tanks, Wehrmacht vests, mattresses and coats).

The company exploited thousands of slave labourers from France, Russia and Poland in its plants in German-occupied Poland, which the company admitted only in 2008. Around this time Dr. Jacek Lachendro, a historian at the Auschwitz museum stated that after the war 1.95 long tons (1,980 kg) rolls of fabric made from inmates' hair had been found at Schaeffler factories in Kiertz (formerly Katscher), and had been used in upholstery in its automotive products. Lachendro stated that analysis of the fabric produced traces of Zyklon B gas. The historian Gregor Schöllgen who investigated the history of the company on behalf of the Schaeffler family claimed in 2009 that there was no evidence for a connection to Auschwitz". for which he was strongly criticized in 2011 by his colleagues Tim Schanetzky, Cornelia Rauh and Toni Pierenkemper.

=== 1946-1989 ===
In 1945, with the Soviet army advancing, the company was moved to the Upper Franconian Schwarzenhammer. 300 "Schaeffler people" as well as machines, raw materials and semi-finished goods arrived in 40 railway wagons. After the end of the war Schwarzenhammer was part of the American occupation zone. In August 1945, the "factory of agricultural machinery" was founded there. After Wilhelm Schaeffler returned from Polish imprisonment in mid-September 1952, this company together with Schaeffler KG was liquidated.

In the spring of 1946, brothers Wilhelm and Georg Schaeffler and two partners founded Industrie-GmbH in Herzogenaurach. The company was initially only allowed to repair agricultural equipment and produce goods from wood, but soon also became a supplier for tool making.

In 1949, the needle roller cage, developed by Georg Schaeffler, made the needle roller bearing a reliable component for industrial applications which propelled INA (Industrie Nadellager) to success.

In 1951, the Saar Nadellager oHG was founded in Homburg as the first INA branch in Germany at that time, however, the Saarland was not yet part of the Federal Republic of Germany, but was under French administration (1947 to 1956). In 1956, the first foreign branch plant was founded in Hagenau. In 1957 production started in Llanelli UK, In 1958 a factory was opened at São Paulo Brazil. In 1963 the first INA foreign subsidiary was founded in the United States.

In 1965, INA acquired the company August Häussermann in Bühl (Baden) and renamed it LuK Lamellen und Kupplungsbau GmbH.

In 1979, INA entered into Hydrel AG, Switzerland, and 1984 into Helmut Elges GmbH, Steinhagen.

In 1989, the carpet business was sold.

=== 1990-1999 ===
In 1991 and 1992, the company expanded Eastward: plants were opened in Skalica, Slovakia, and Ansan, Korea and in 1995 the INA Bearings China Co. Ltd. was founded in Taicang, China. Under the direction of Jürgen Geißinger (November 1998 to October 2013) the company followed an "aggressive acquisition strategy". In 1999, INA took over LuK GmbH. In 2001, the group bought the Schweinfurt competitor FAG Kugelfischer in a hostile takeover.

=== 21st century ===
- 2002: Acquisition of FAG Kugelfischer AG, Schweinfurt.
- 2003: INA, FAG and LuK form the Schaeffler Group.
- 2008: In August 2008, the Schaeffler family agreed to a staggered €12 billion acquisition of larger rival Continental AG Germany, whereby the family would defer taking a majority stake until at least 2012.
- 2009: President and CEO of the Schaeffler Group, Dr. Jürgen M. Geissinger, was elected president of the World Bearing Association.
- 2011: Schaeffler Group became Schaeffler AG and Schaeffler Technologies AG & Co. KG as the family sold off €1.8 billion worth of shares, reducing its stake from 75.1% to 60.3%.
- 2013: On 4 October, an employee letter said "... Mr. Klaus Rosenfeld will take over as acting CEO in addition to his current responsibilities as Chief Financial Officer".
- 2013: The third generation of Schaeffler's electric axle, presented in Schaeffler's ACTIVeDRIVE, becomes a pilot production product.
- 2014: Schaeffler opens its first Russian plant in Ulyanovsk, from which it supplies products to both domestic and overseas automobile manufacturers as well as to the railway industry.
- 2015: Schaeffler successfully completes its initial public offering on 9 October 2015, under the motto "We share our success".
- 2016: The strategy "Mobility for tomorrow" is adopted. U.S. and China plants are expanded and a new facility is opened in Chonburi, Thailand, along with a new office in Moscow, Russia.
- 2018: Schaeffler fitted four electric motors from the ABT Schaeffler FE01 Formula E car to an Audi A3 for testing only.
- 2018: Schaeffler acquired the drive-by-wire company Paravan for development of autonomous vehicle technology.
- As of 2021, the family owned 46% of Continental shares and 49.94% of Vitesco Technologies.
- 2023: Schaeffler and Vitesco Technologies Group AG signed a Business Combination Agreement

In 2024, Schaeffler announced that 4,700 jobs will be eliminated, 2,800 alone in Germany, one plant in Austria and one in the UK will be closed, while bearing production in Berndorf, Austria, would cease. The production of couplings in Sheffield, England would be discontinued.

== Business divisions and products ==
Since January 2025, following its merger with Vitesco Technologies, Schaeffler has organised its businesses into four divisions:

E-Mobility’s products range from individual electric motors and inverters to complete electric axle assemblies. These combine the motor, transmission and power electronics. The division also makes electronic controls and thermal-management systems for electric and hybrid vehicles.

Powertrain & Chassis makes clutches and torque converters for vehicle transmissions, alongside sensors and actuators. Wheel bearings, rear-wheel steering and damping systems form its chassis range, which is used in combustion-engine, hybrid and battery-electric vehicles.

Vehicle Lifetime Solutions sells replacement parts and repair kits for cars, commercial vehicles and tractors. These cover repairs to engines, transmissions and chassis. Through REPXPERT, repair shops can access technical training, installation guides and repair information.

Bearings & Industrial Solutions division makes rolling and plain bearings for applications ranging from industrial machinery and railway vehicles to wind turbines and aircraft engines. It also produces direct-drive systems.

== Manufacturing and development ==
Schaeffler’s manufacturing plants, research and development centres and sales offices span more than 250 locations in 55 countries. Its operations are organised into four regions: Europe, the Americas, Greater China and Asia/Pacific.

=== Germany ===
Schaeffler’s main development centres in Germany are in Herzogenaurach, Schweinfurt and Bühl. At Bühl, the company develops and manufactures electric-drive products, including electric motors. The E-Mobility division shares the group’s headquarters in Herzogenaurach. Schweinfurt is the main manufacturing site for Bearings & Industrial Solutions. Following the Vitesco merger, Regensburg was chosen as the headquarters of the Powertrain Solutions.

=== Slovakia ===
In Slovakia, Schaeffler has manufacturing plants in Kysucké Nové Mesto and Skalica. The Kysuce factory also has engineers working on hybrid modules, electric axles and chassis systems. A development centre opened there in 2023, with facilities for software and hardware development, simulation and testing. The Skalica plant makes bearings and transmission components.

=== Czechia ===
In Czechia, Schaeffler develops automotive sensors at its Ostrava-Hrabová centre, which also tests and validates products and manages the group’s Fluid & Temperature Sensors business. A separate factory in Ostrava-Hrušov makes high-voltage electronics for battery-electric vehicles. At Frenštát pod Radhoštěm, the company works on battery-management and powertrain-control systems. In Svitavy, engineers develop thermal-management modules alongside the factory that produces them. The site also has a laboratory for testing cooling systems used in combustion-engine, hybrid and electric vehicles.

=== Hungary ===
Schaeffler’s Szombathely site in Hungary manufactures electric motors and components for hybrid powertrains. Its second factory, opened in 2021, produces stator and rotor assemblies for electric motors. In Debrecen, one factory makes bearings for combustion-engine, hybrid and battery-electric vehicles. A separate electronics plant, formerly part of Vitesco Technologies, produces transmission actuators, 48-volt DC/DC converters and starter-generator inverters for hybrid vehicles.

== See also ==
- Georg F. W. Schaeffler
