= Grinding wheel wear =

Grinding wheel wear is an important measured factor of grinding in the manufacturing process of engineered parts and tools. Grinding involves the removal process of material and modifying the surface of a workpiece to some desired finish which might otherwise be unachievable through conventional machining processes. The grinding process itself has been compared to machining operations which employ multipoint cutting tools. The abrasive grains which make up the entire geometry of wheel act as independent small cutting tools. The quality, characteristics, and rate of grinding wheel wear can be affected by contributions of the characteristics of the material of the workpiece, the temperature increase of the workpiece, and the rate of wear of the grinding wheel itself. Moderate wear rate allows for more consistent material size. Maintaining stable grinding forces is preferred rather than high wheel wear rate which can decrease the effectiveness of material removal from the workpiece.

== Mechanisms of wheel wear ==
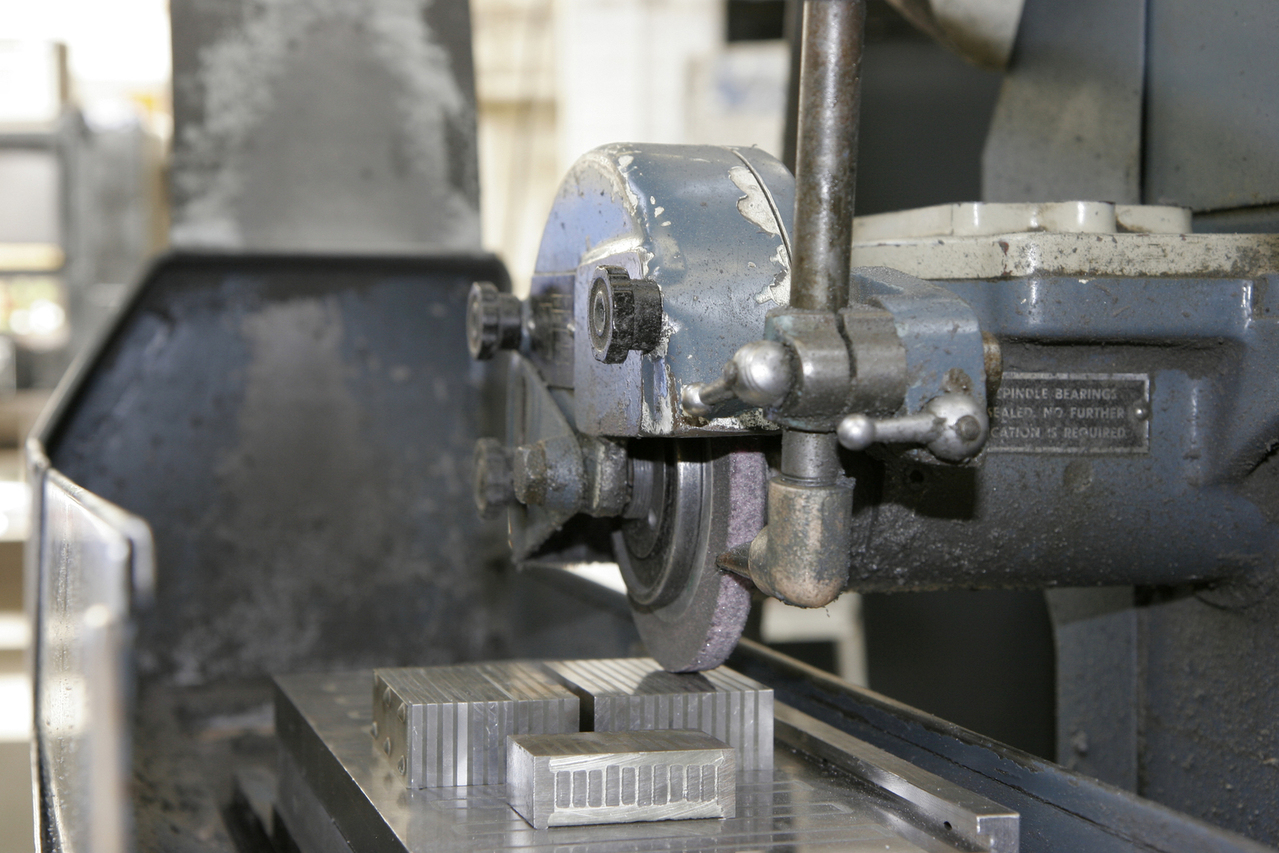
Industrial Grinding Gear

A common attributing factor to wheel wear is grain fracture, which can be an advantage. A portion of each of the individual grains on the wheel surface breaks apart and leaves the remaining grain bonded to the wheel. The fractured grain is left with newly exposed sharp edges which attribute the self-sharpening characteristic of grinding wheels and cutting tools in general. Attritious wear or progressive wear which is typically undesirable leads to the grains dulling by developing flat spots and rounded edges on the wheel which can deteriorate the wheel’s ability to remove material. Flat spots also can lead to excessive heat generation with the added surface contact which in turn enables bond fracture, or the brittle fracture of the adhesive bonds between the grains. The removal of these worn grains from the adhesive bonds restores the wheel’s cutting ability once more. Grinding wheels can also be characterized by the grains’ increased capacity to fracture according to a level of higher value of friability. Different bonding materials are used depending on the intended use of the grinding wheel. The bonding material is classified by its individual strength called its wheel grade.

== Grinding forces ==
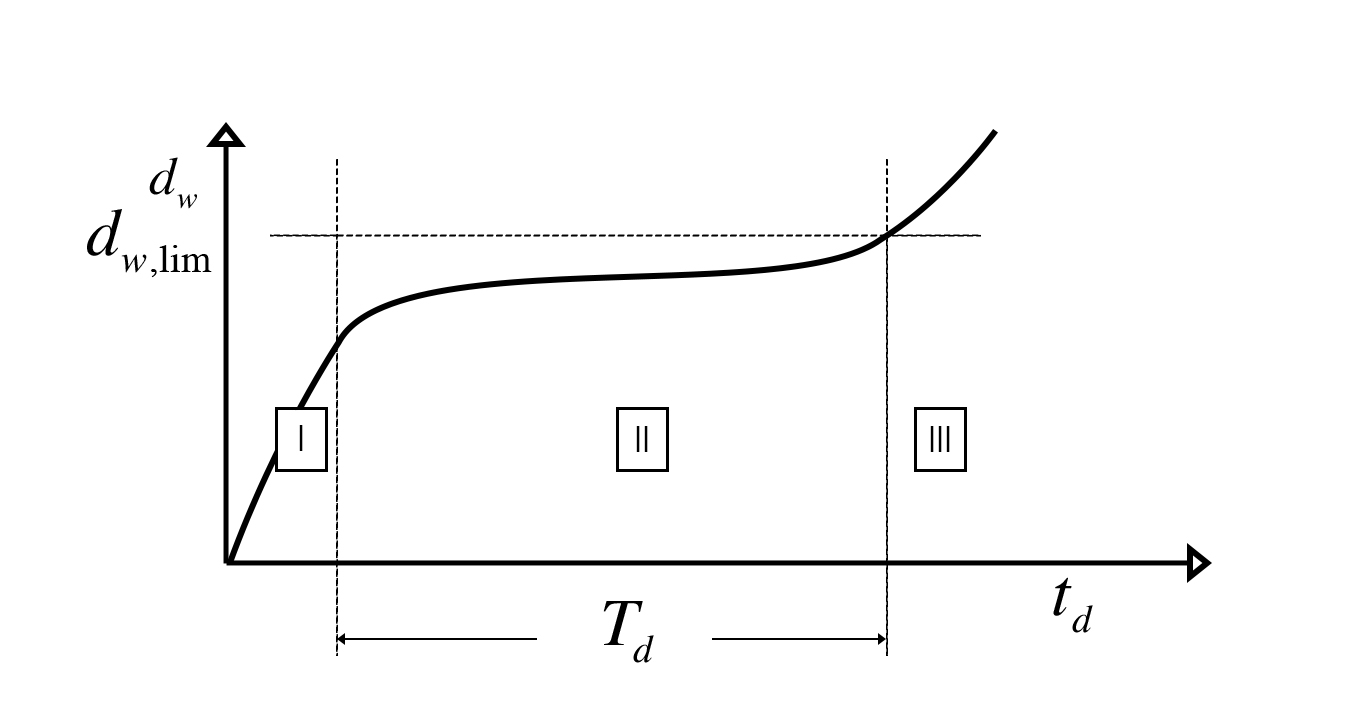
Grinding Wheel Wear Curve: Diameter of wear (mm) as a function of time (td), Three stages of grinding, and dressing/tool life determined in stage II (Td).

The longevity and cutting ability of a grinding wheel can be affected by the grinding forces generated while in use. Experimental investigation has revealed a direct relationship between cutting speed, wheel geometry, chip geometry, and the grinding forces namely the resultant normal force component (F_{n} ), the tangential force component (F_{t} ), and their ratio when in contact with a workpiece.

Stage I: As a workpiece enters the grinding zone the initial contact forces are unstable and rise abruptly short period of time and a small wear spot is formed. The overall performance of a wheel during this moment of unstable rising forces can be minimized with proper dressing conditions prior to use and can help effect the high peak and steady state forces which should normally be contained within a short period of time.

Stage II: During the steady state wear stage reaction forces are constant and the flow of heat generation in both the work piece and wheel remain in equilibrium. The measurable data in this stage presents itself as a linear rate of wear as a function of the working duration of the dresser application or tool life (T_{d}). The tool life corresponds to the grinding wheels ability to maintain the initial shape give to it during the dressing prior to use. As the workpiece stays full contact with the grinding zone in the steady state of constant forces the flow of heat generation in the work piece and the wheel maintains equilibrium. This phase usually does not produce temperatures that would coincide with bond fracture however the material properties of the bond strength can determine the maximum applied force the wheel grit can sustain prior to fracture.

Stage III: Wear rates on the workpiece become detrimental while the rate of change in reaction forces decreases. The end of tool-life represent the initial dressing condition are no longer effective. The rate of change of forces generated in this stage are minimal and wear on the workpiece as an exponential tendency.

== Effects of cutting temperature ==
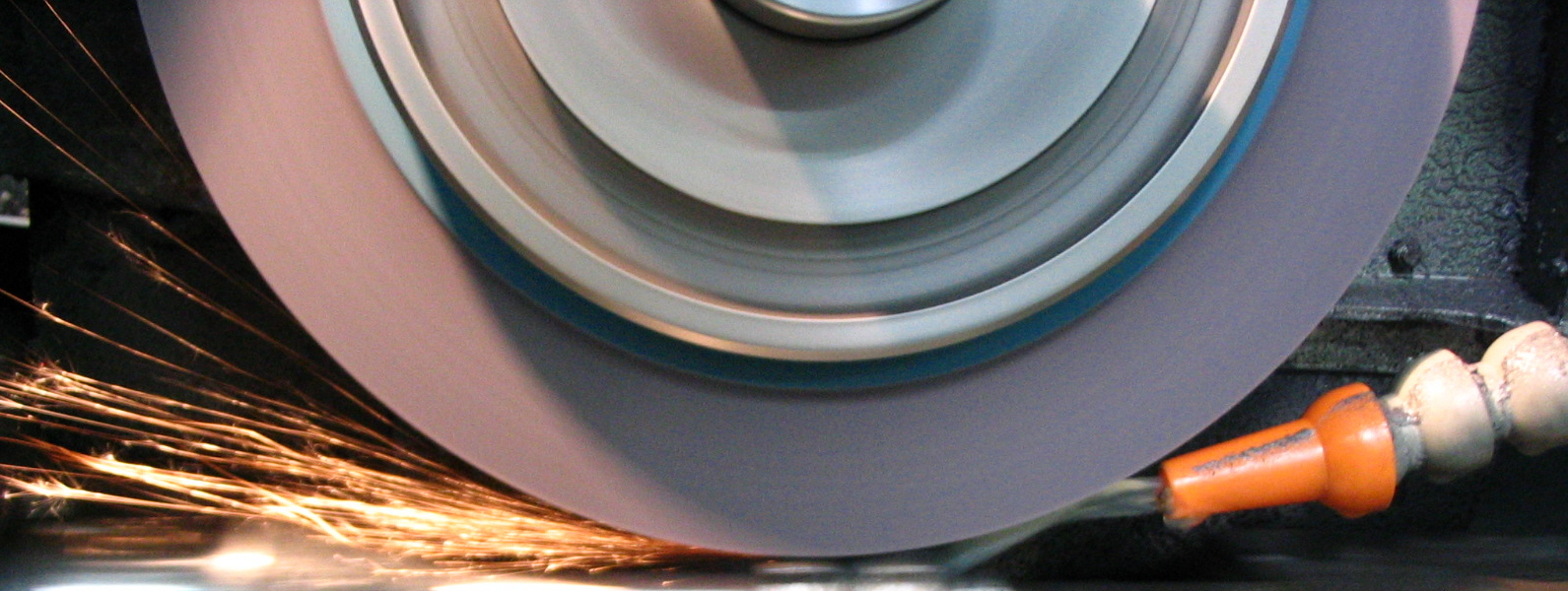
Grinding with the use of lubricant

The lifespan of the grinding wheel and final surface properties of the workpiece are directly affected by the operating cutting temperature. Heat generated during grinding penetrates the grinding wheel and the workpiece which can cause dimensional errors due to thermal expansion

Several adverse effects of a high cutting temperature are as follows:

- Tempering
- Burning
- Thermal cracks
- Residual stresses

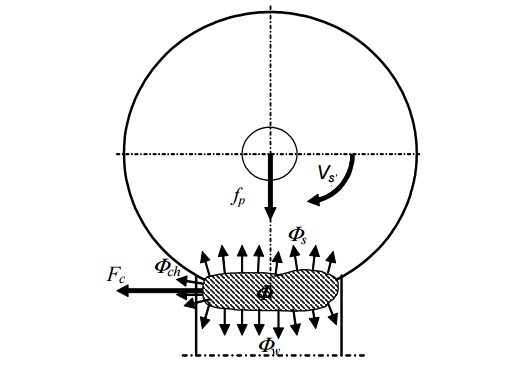
The heat flux distribution at the grinding wheel-workpiece interface

The addition of grinding fluids can effectively control cutting temperatures to reduce heat induced surface effects on the wheel and workpiece.

High heat flux density may result in the grinding wheel melting and consequently, increased wear. The heat flux (Φ) penetrating the grinding wheel and workpiece depends mainly on the cutting speed (v_{s}) and cutting force (F_{c}). The temperature of the grinding wheel is related to the density of heat flux (φ = dΦ/dA) generated (which also is directly proportional to the feed rate). An approximate value of the heat flux can be calculated as follows: Φ = F_{c} • v_{s}

== Grinding wheel types ==
Grinding wheels can be made with a variety of materials depending on the desired abrasive quality required during use. Abrasive material, natural of synthetic, used in grinding include some common types of grinding wheel geometry.

1. Straight
2. Cylinder
3. Straight Cup
4. A variety of material types

== Abrasive grains ==
The process of grinding requires an abrasive component with material properties harder than the workpiece. Most common grinders employ a rotating surface being brought in contact with a work surface. The wheel component of grinder itself is generally composed of abrasive grains held together by a bond structure which contain some amount of porosity.

== Wheel speed ==
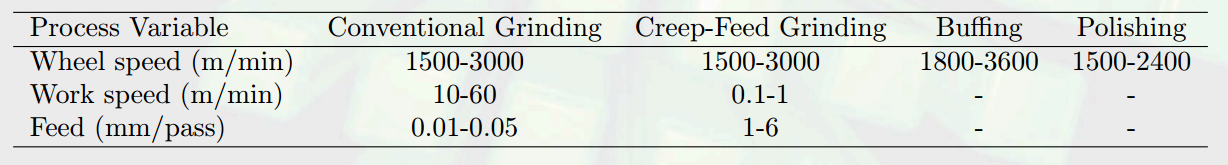
Typical ranges and speeds for abrasive processes

The grinding wheel typically operates at high rotational speeds. The wheel speed depends on several factors, some of which included the grindability of the wheel, the shape of the part, and the material of the workpiece. These properties will affect important parameters such as the surface finish, surface integrity, and wheel wear. Likewise, the grinding wheel speed will depend on which abrasive process is needed and which finishing process is desired.

== Dressing ==
A worn grinding wheel can be dressed to restore its grinding properties. Dressing a grinding wheel causes new grains to be produced on a glazed or loaded grinding wheel. A glazed grinding wheel is the result of high attritious wear causing the grains to become dull. A loaded grinding wheel is a result of chips clogging the grains on the grinding wheel due to the grinding of soft materials, improper grinding wheel selection processing parameters. In addition to sharpening a grinding wheel dressing can also be used to true a grinding wheel that is out of round or to shape the profile of a grinding wheel to produce specific features on the workpiece.

== See also ==
- Grinding wheel
- Grinding dresser
- Manufacturing
- Grinding machine
- Metalworking
