= Vitesco Technologies =

German automotive supplier

Vitesco Technologies Group AG
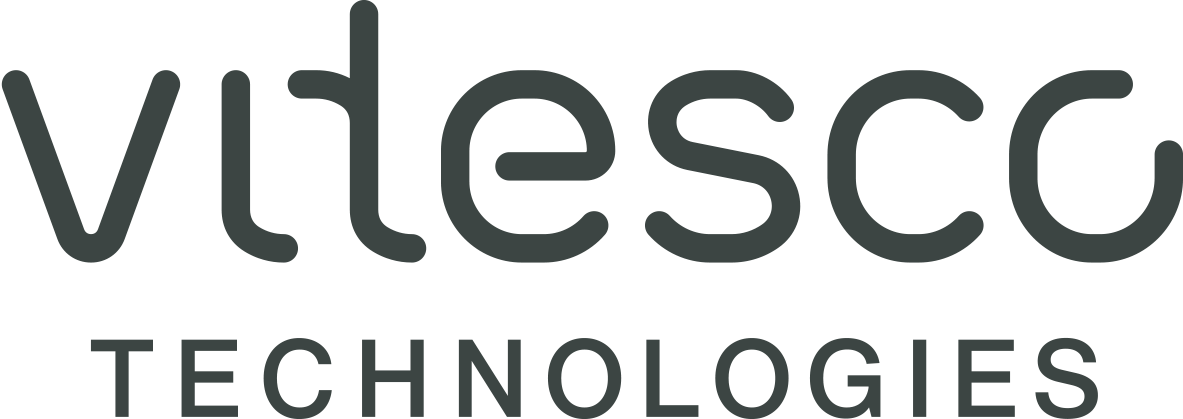

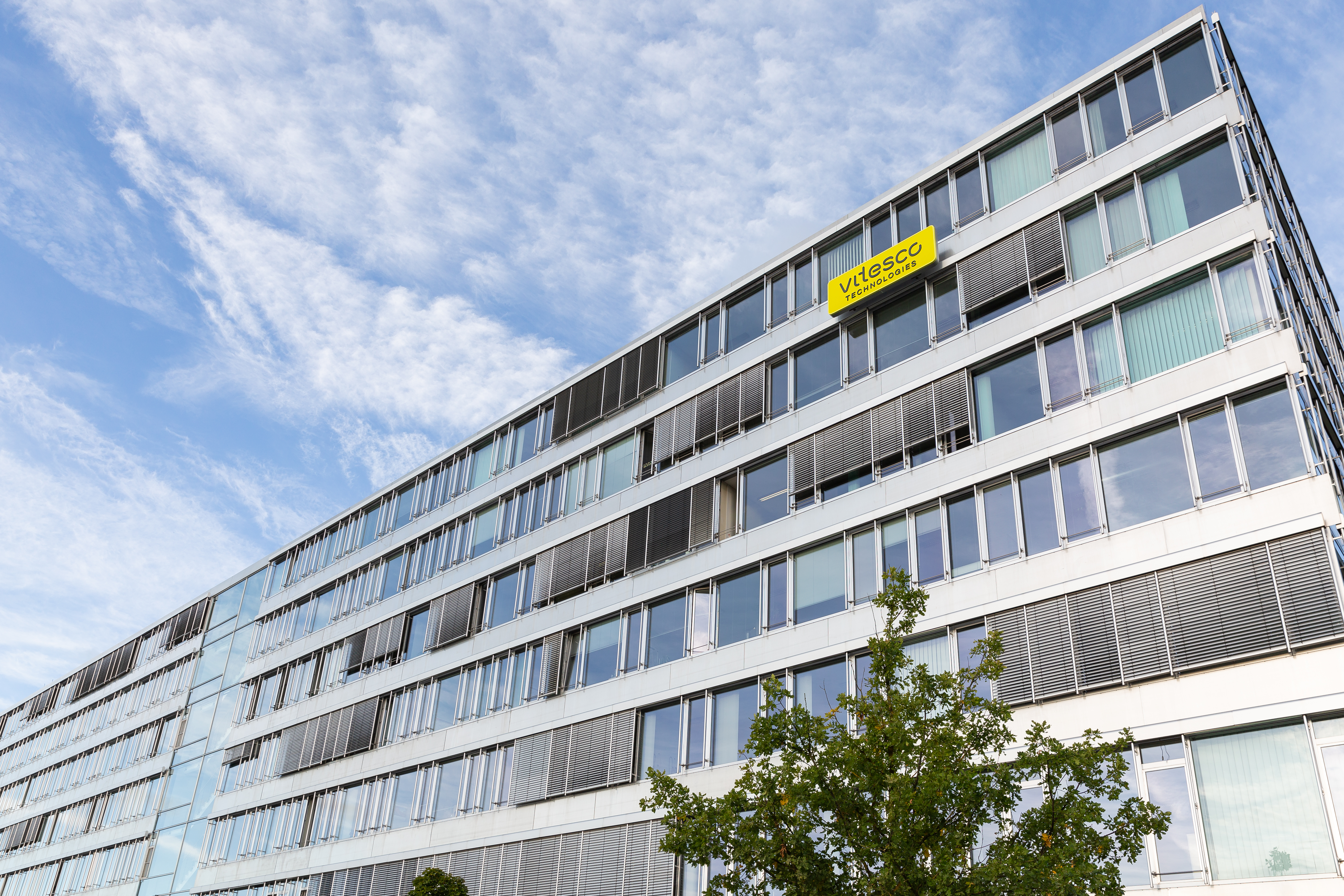
- Company type: Public (Aktiengesellschaft)
- Traded as: FWB: VTSC; LSE: 0AAF; OTC Pink Current: VTSCF; OTC Pink Current: VTSCY (ADR)
- ISIN: DE000VTSC017; US92853L1089
- Industry: Automotive supplier
- Founded: 1 January 2019; 7 years ago
- Headquarters: Regensburg, Germany
- Area served: Worldwide
- Key people: Andreas Wolf (CEO)
- Revenue: 9.23 billion euro (2023)
- Number of employees: approx. 35,500 (2023)
- Website: vitesco-technologies.com

Vitesco Technologies Group AG (known until autumn 2019 as Continental Powertrain), headquartered in Regensburg, is a German automotive supplier for drivetrain and powertrain technologies. Vitesco Technologies was a business area of Continental AG until it became independent in September 2021. The company develops devices for electric vehicles as well as internal combustion engines.

== History ==
On 1 January 2019, Continental Powertrain was carved out from the Continental AG. The brand name was changed from Continental Powertrain to Vitesco Technologies. The new name was introduced on 1 October 2019.

In 2019, the company introduced a 48-volt-high-power drive with an output of 30 kW.

On 16 September 2021, Vitesco Technologies became independent from Continental and was listed on the Frankfurt Stock Exchange.

On 1 October 2024, Vitesco Technologies merged with Schaeffler Group.

== Company structure ==
Vitesco Technologies was founded to act as a more independent and entrepreneurially flexible company. Andreas Wolf had headed Continental's Powertrain division since 2018 and became CEO of Vitesco Technologies after the demerger.

Vitesco Technologies has two divisions which act economically independent:

- Electrification Solutions
- Powertrain Solutions

== Products ==
The company develops components for hybrid electric, electric drive and combustion engines. The product portfolio includes electric drives, electronic control units, sensors and actuators, as well as exhaust management devices.

The products include electric drives, including 48-volt-systems, hybrid technologies, and high-voltage components.

=== Electric machine ===
The 48-volt-hybrid component, consisting of an electric machine with integrated power electronics and battery, has comparable functions to a high-voltage electric machine. It is more compact, lighter and cheaper to produce, while having the same efficiency.

=== Axle drive ===
Its high-voltage axle drive has two power outputs, 120 and 150 kW. It combines the electric machine, power electronics and reduction gear in one unit. Its size and efficiency makes it suitable for vehicles.

=== Power electronics ===
Power electronics control the cooperation between the electric machine and the battery. Vitesco offers various types of vehicles with power electronics: plug-in hybrids and battery electric vehicles. The integrated power module allows a current of up to 650 amperes and provides the electric machine with energy and controls the energy recovery.

=== Electronics motor reducer (EMR4) ===
This machine uses an externally-excited synchronous motor. Its rotor uses no permanent magnets and no rare earth minerals. The company claims that its motor provides power and efficiency comparable to permanent magnet synchronous motors, but at lower cost. The machine saves one watt-hour of electricity per kilometre (5%), because no permanent magnetic field brakes the rotor.
