= Grinding dresser =

Tool to dress the surface of a grinding wheel

A grinding dresser or wheel dresser is a tool to dress (slightly trim) the surface of a grinding wheel. Grinding dressers are used to return a wheel to its original round shape (to true it up), to expose fresh grains for renewed cutting action (including cleaning away clogged areas), or to make a different profile (cross-sectional shape) on the wheel's edge. Utilizing predetermined dressing parameters will allow the wheel to be conditioned for optimum grinding performance while truing and restoring the form simultaneously.

== Purpose ==
The objective of dressing the wheel is to:

- True the wheel by knocking abrasive particles from the wheel's surface and making the wheel concentric. This minimizes vibration and improves surface finish, eliminating the vibration of the out-of-balance wheel across the workpiece's surface. It is not unusual for grinding wheels to become out of round with use. This is partially from loaded (clogged) areas of the wheel wearing at different rates from less loaded areas. It can also be exacerbated by grinding when the wheel is not under power, such as using the work to apply braking action to the wheel to stop it from coasting. Dressing restores the roundness. When bench grinders vibrate excessively, it is usually because the wheels have worn out of round and are thus out of balance. Truing them by dressing resolves this problem.
- Dislodge these abrasive particles to expose fresh abrasive from the wheel's surface. Each abrasive grain is a small cutting tool; a worn grain has its edges dulled and loses its effectiveness. Exposing the fresh grains is thus a sharpening process. Glazing of the wheel is evidence of rounded grains and is noticeable by a reflective surface on the spinning wheel.
- Clean the wheel. If a workpiece is softer than the grade for which the wheel is designed, the abrasive particles will not be dislodged in time to present fresh, sharp grains. The wheel therefore appears to lose its edge especially as the pores between grains fill with fragments of the workpiece. The wheel is then said to be loaded. This is one reason why the selection of wheel is extremely important.
- Condition the wheel. Establish the optimum dressing parameters to achieve the part tolerance/finish requirements. Truing and conditioning of the wheel will happen simultaneously so understanding the wheel condition needed to achieve the desired part condition is critical.

== Types ==
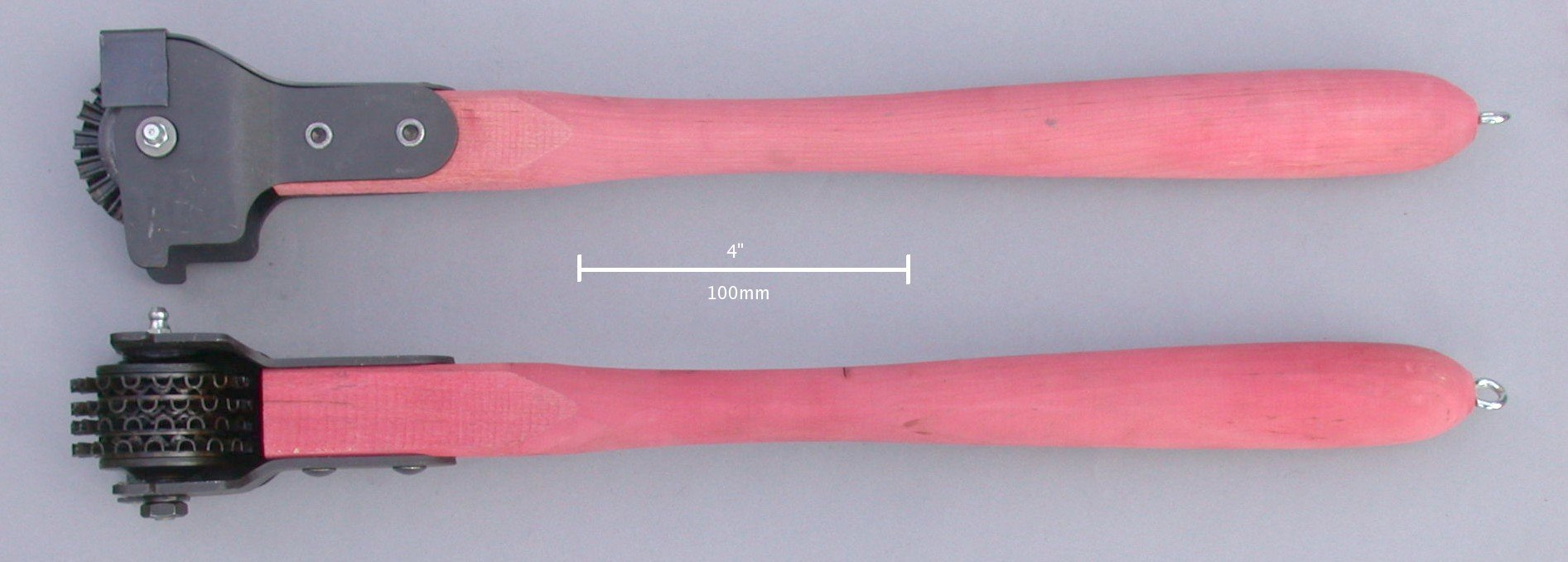
Star or disc wheel dresser

- Star dressers — A long handled tool with a row of free running, hardened and serrated, wavy discs or star-shaped cutters running at right angles to the handle. These are presented to the grinding wheel as power is turned off and the wheel slows down. Force is applied to the face of the slowing wheel with the result that the hardened discs match speed with the face of the wheel allowing the fingers or undulating surface of the dresser, to knock the abrasive grains out.

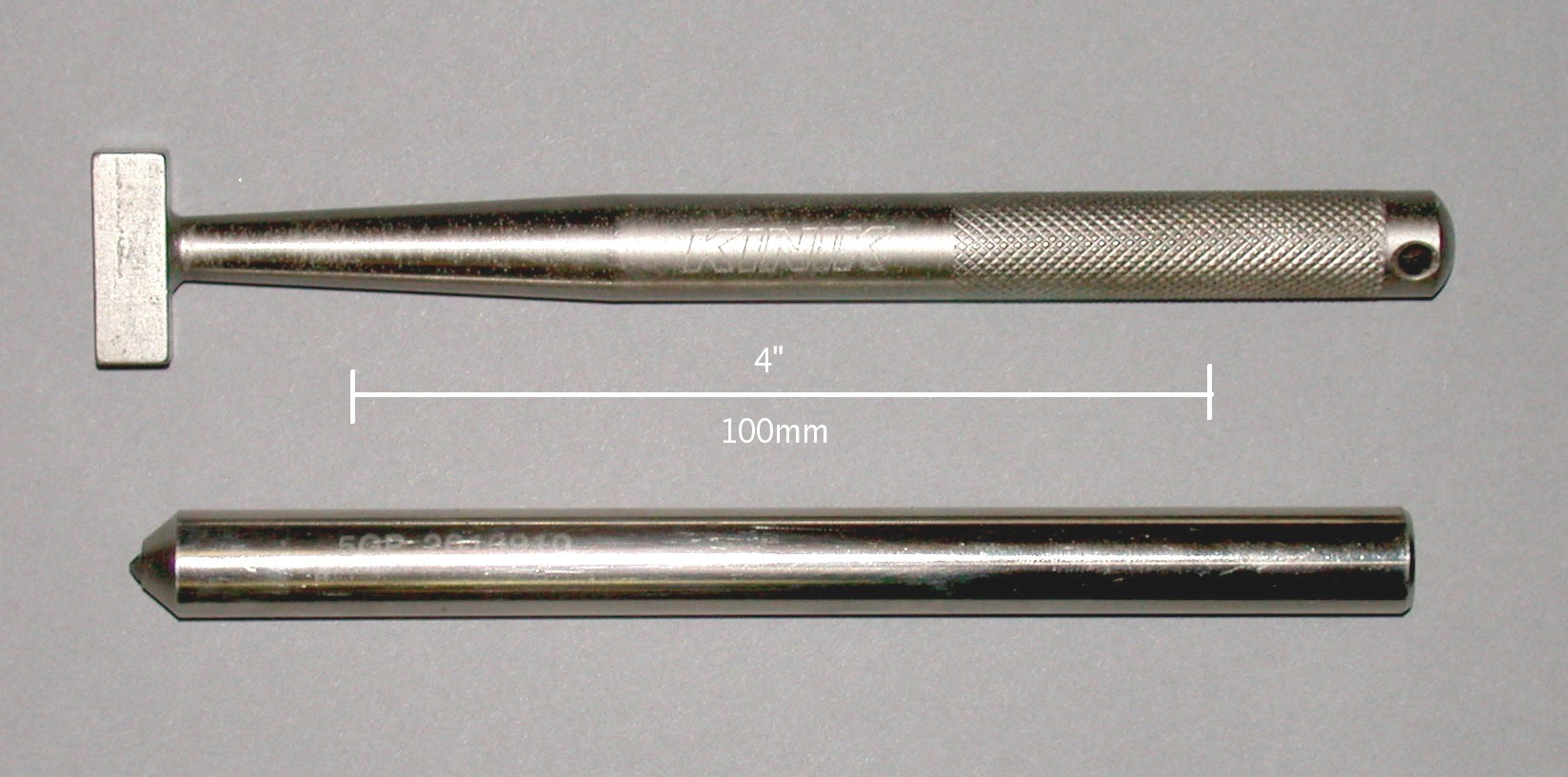
Diamond dressers

- Diamond dressers — Shorter handled diamond tools that either have a matrix of small diamonds bonded to a broad surface on the end of the dresser (top image) or a single diamond mounted in their face (lower image). As the diamond is introduced to the wheel's face, the harder diamond remains attached and the looser grains fall away.
- Dressing sticks — A stick of hard material, usually made from the same materials (silicon carbide) but with a stronger bonding agent. NorBide is one brand of dressing stick made by Norton Abrasives from boron nitride.

Also an abrasive wheel type that has a small "grinding wheel" in a holder that is held against the spinning grinding wheel to dress and clean the face of the grinding wheel.

=== Grinding complex shapes ===
Four types of dressers are used to dress the wheels of CNC grinders used for grinding complex shapes. This type of dresser is mainly in use on CNC grinding machine tools to automatically dress the grinding wheel via computer control in specialist areas requiring complex shapes such as grinding bearing raceways.

- Stationary dressers — a stationary dresser can have multiple diamonds hand set or a (mesh) across a given width. These type tools are typically used to dress straight faced wheels. Stationary tools can also be a single diamond brazed into the tip and ground to a specific radius size. A CNC dressing program will utilize this specific tool nose radius offset and move it across the face of the wheel, moving in and out to create the desired profile. The grinding wheel's profile is controlled by the CNC program used to dress the wheel, rather than by the profile of the dresser itself.
- Crush rolls — a crush roll is a high-speed steel or tungsten carbide wheel. Its profile is the mirror image of the desired profile of the grinding wheel. It is forced against the grinding wheel, while spinning at the same surface speed as the grinding wheel. Doing so breaks the bond between the abrasive particles on the surface of the wheel, exposing a new surface as particles fall away. One disadvantage is that the wheel profile cannot be adjusted except by replacing the roll with one having a different profile.
- Diamond dressing rolls — a diamond dressing roll is a dressing roll coated with diamond particles. It wears more slowly and less wear mean they can be used to achieve tighter tolerances than plain crush rolls.
- Rotary dressers — a rotary dresser (sometimes referred to as a pizza-cutter dresser) is a disc with a hard material - usually diamond - attached to the edge. The grinding wheel's profile has a specific radius size and is controlled by the CNC program used to dress the wheel, rather than by the profile of the dresser itself.

Wheel Conditioning Proper wheel conditioning is a critical part of any grinding process. The condition of the wheel will determine the wheel's ability to meet the part finish requirements and metal removal rate capabilities. The grains in the wheel can be sheared to create a smooth condition or fractured to create a course open condition utilizing dressing parameters.

- Truing the wheel and restoring the form will happen simultaneously while you are conditioning the wheel.
- Conditioning a wheel with a stationary tool or a rotary dresser/pizza cutter are the same if you are working with a known radius tip.
- When using a stationary tool or a rotary dresser, the traverse rate across the wheel face will determine the wheel condition.
- Slower rates give a finer finish and faster rates give a coarser finish.
- Conditioning the wheel with a shaped diamond dressing roll requires the roll to be plunged into the grinding wheel at a predetermined speed and infeed rate.
- Controlling the speed ratio and infeed rates are a critical part of acquiring and maintaining the desired wheel condition.
- Counter-Directional dressing will sheer the grains and create a smooth wheel face.
- Uni-Directional dressing will fracture the grains and create a rough wheel face.

=== Skate sharpening ===
Grinders used for sharpening skate blades typically have one or more thin grinding wheels mounted on vertical spindles, with a single-diamond dresser mounted on a gymbal with a horizontal axis level with the centerline of the wheel, so it can swing above and below the plane of the wheel, producing a convex grinding surface of a predetermined radius. This allows the blade to be sharpened to a specified hollow, typically very deep for hockey skates, very shallow for skates used for school figures, and moderate for skates used for freestyle skating. Modern skate sharpening equipment can be automated and portable such as is found in the Sparx Hockey skate sharpener.
