= Wire race bearing =

Rolling-element bearing, where the balls or rollers run on races resembling loops of wire

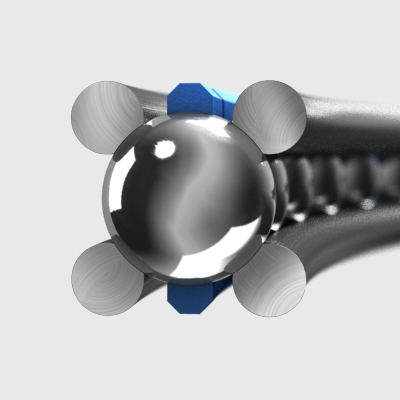
Cross section of a wire race bearing with ground inner and outer rings

A wire race bearing is a rolling-element bearing, where the balls or rollers run on races resembling loops of wire. Roller bearings may use just two races, but ball bearings typically use three or four races. Wire race bearings can be large yet lightweight and with small profile and good precision. Wire races have little intrinsic structure and must be adequately supported by the bearing housing. Balls, rollers or even cross rollers are used as rolling elements. Due to the design wire race bearings are commonly called '4-point-contact' bearings.

The first wire race bearing was invented in 1934 by Erich Franke, co-founder of Franke & Heydrich KG in Aalen, Germany (nowadays Franke GmbH). As a young design engineer of Carl-Zeiss-Werke in Jena, Franke intended to design a very space-saving bearing for an optical device. The aim of his thoughts was a much closer relation between bearing and enclosing design to keep it as compact and as lightweight as possible.

== Types ==
The most common type consist of two open inner and outer rings each. Types using just three rings can be used for special applications to compensate e.g. angular offset. There are types forming a converging angle ball bearing using two rows of balls set up with two race rings each. A special type for mainly radial loads can be set up with just two race rings.

== Comparison with standard ball bearings ==
The space-saving design is the main advantage with the capability of loads and moments from all directions at the same time. Because the rolling elements run on race rings, the enclosing design is not exposed directly to stressing of the rolling process, thus allowing use of alternate materials like aluminium, brass or plastic as housing. Another advantage is that rotational resistance and pre-load can be adjusted precisely.

Due to the specific design, wire race bearings also have inherent system disadvantages like increased assembly time, because the race rings must be inserted accurately into the enclosing design to ensure faultless function.

== Applications ==
Wire race bearings are used in linear bearings of micro-positioning (XY) stages commonly found on microscopes.

== Wire race bearing manufacturers ==
- Rothe Erde Dortmund
- Franke GmbH, Franke gmbh website (external link)
