= Friedrich Fischer =

Inventor of modern ball bearings

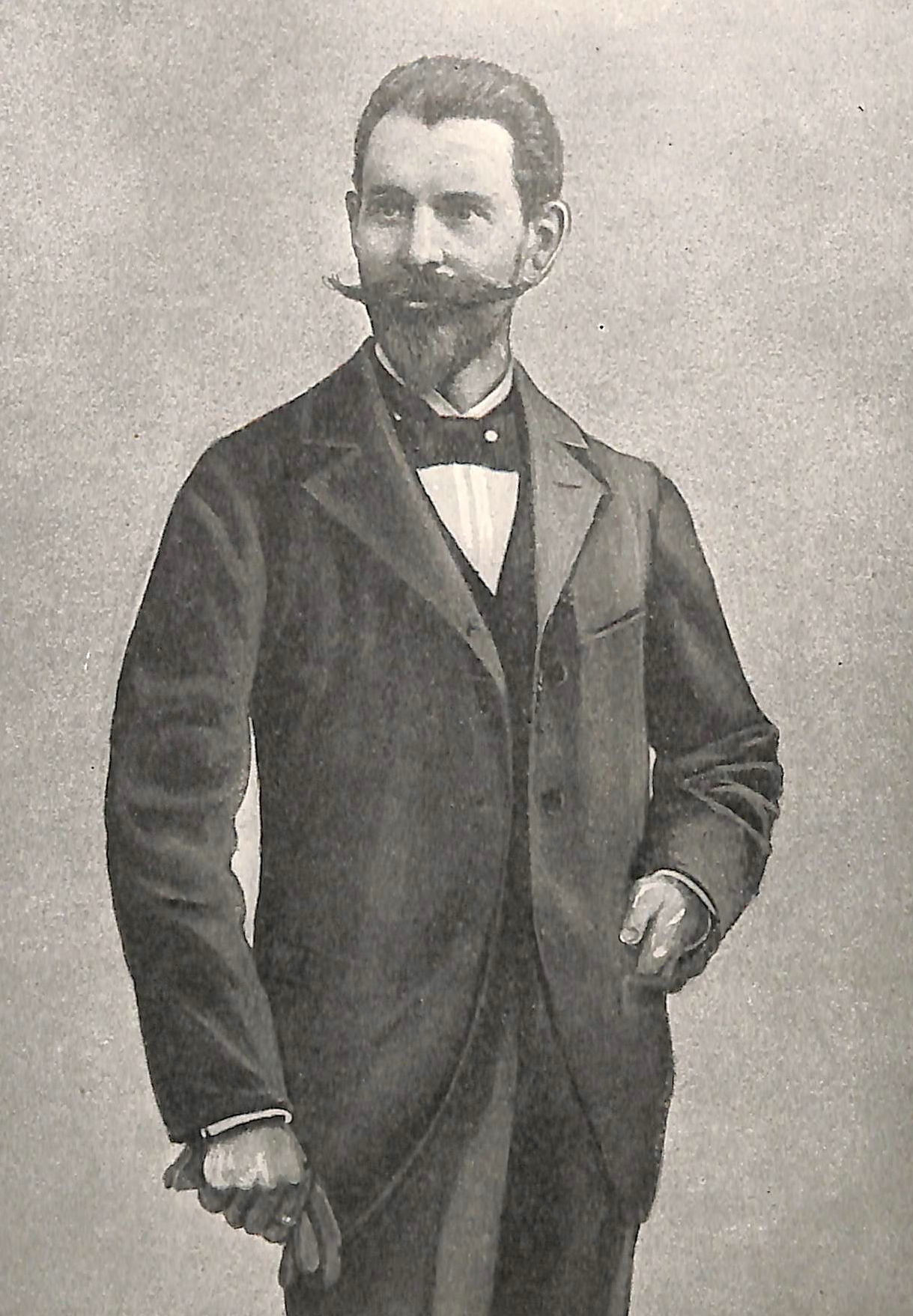
- Friedrich Fischer
- Born: March 19, 1849; Schweinfurt, Germany
- Died: October 2, 1899 (aged 50)
- Known for: Invention of the ball grinding mill

Friedrich Fischer (March 19, 1849 – October 2, 1899) was a German inventor from Schweinfurt known for inventing the industrial process for making standard ball bearings in 1883.

== Biography ==
Fischer designed the ball grinding mill, a machine that allows steel balls to be ground to an absolutely round state in large volumes for the first time. His innovation was to tilt slightly the grinding wheel by 1.9°, forcing the balls to rotate on both their axis while they are ground. This innovation revolutionized the ball bearing industry and made the city of Schweinfurt the center of ball bearing manufacturing.

Later, 1883 is officially declared the year in which the company was founded.

- 1890 - On July 17, Fischer received the patent for his ball grinding machine from the Kaiserliches Patentamt (German Imperial Patent Office).
- 1895 - The UK Imperial Patent Office grants Fischer patent number 10925A for his ball grinding and milling machine.
- 1896 - Fischer applies for permission to build a new plant near the train station in Schweinfurt – a step towards a new industrial dimension. The new plant produces 10 million balls per week. The company is incorporated one year later.
- 1899 - Friedrich Fischer suffered a stroke and died at the age of 50 on October 2. He did not have any children. With the death of this innovator and entrepreneur, his 400 employees lost the driving force of the company. The company's financial situation worsened. This was also due to the persisting crisis in the ball industry, which was caused by overproduction, competitive pressure, protective duties, etc.
- 1905 - On July 29, the FAG brand is registered with the patent office in Berlin. The registered trademark FAG, which stands for Fischers Aktien-Gesellschaft, is protected in over 100 countries today.

== Legacy ==
Today the FAG brand is owned by the Schaeffler Group.

Legacy of Friedrich Fischer

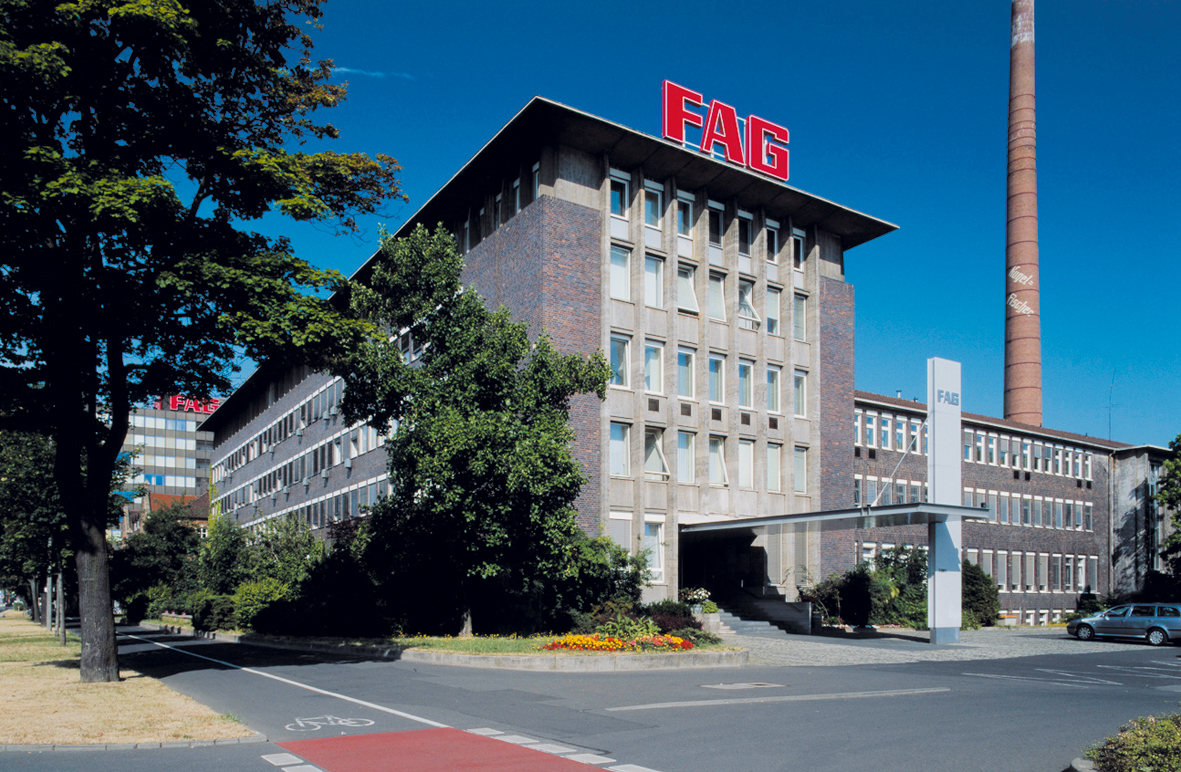
The headquarters of FAG Kugelfischer in Schweinfurt (ca 2001)

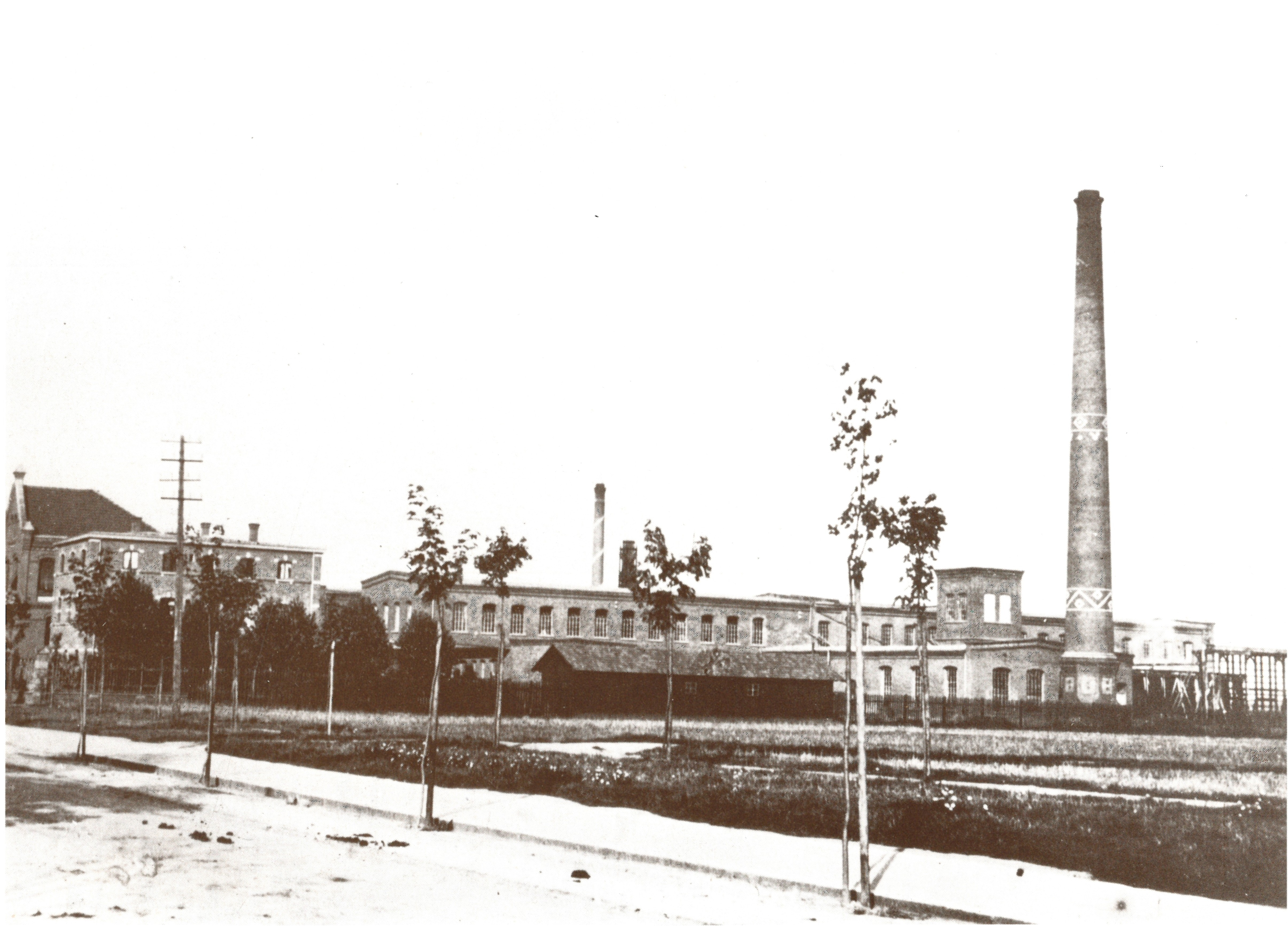
Hauptbahnhofstraße mit neuer Fabrik, nach 1896; am linken Bildrand mit erstem Verwaltungsbau

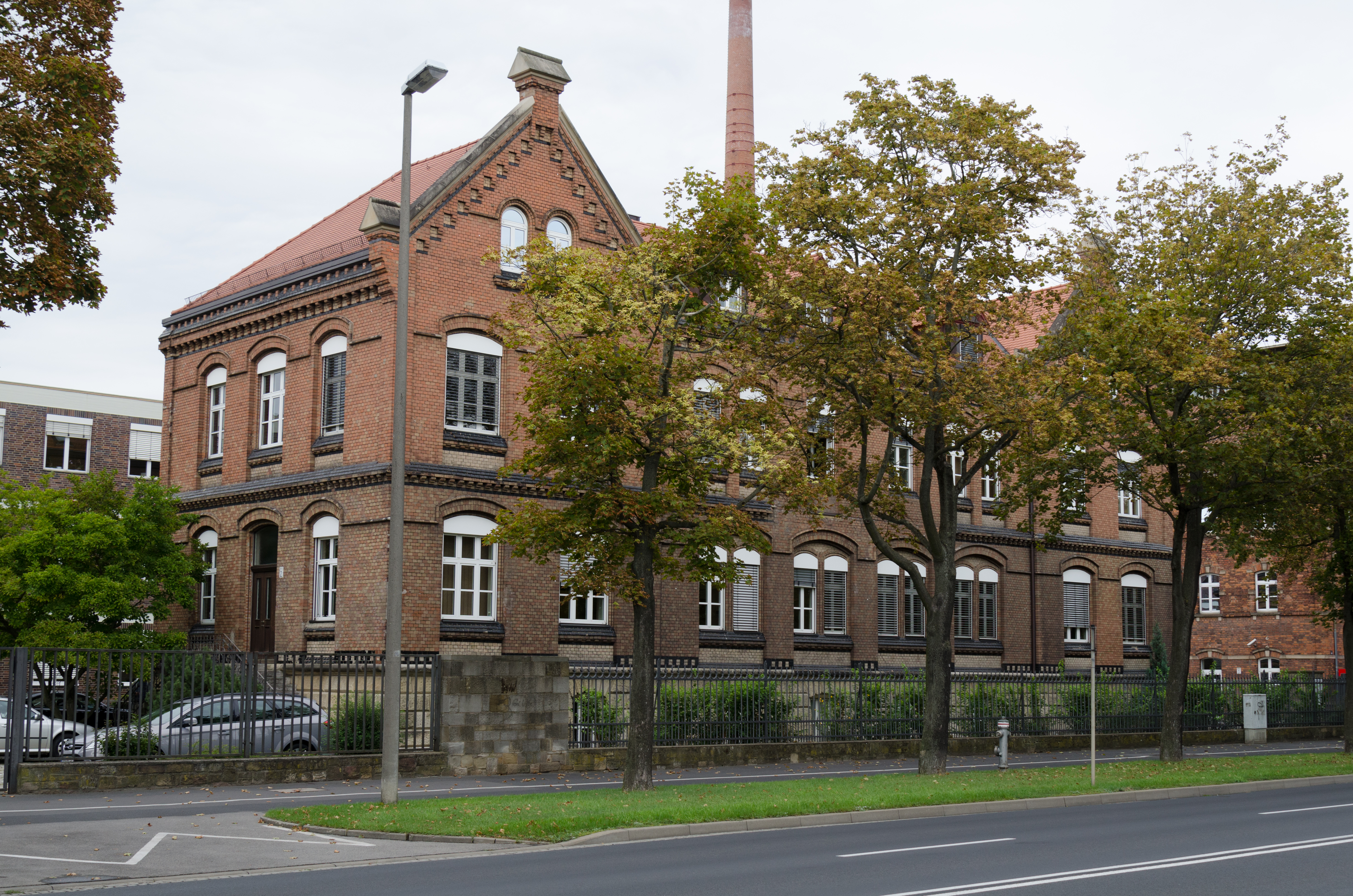
Erster Verwaltungsbau von 1897

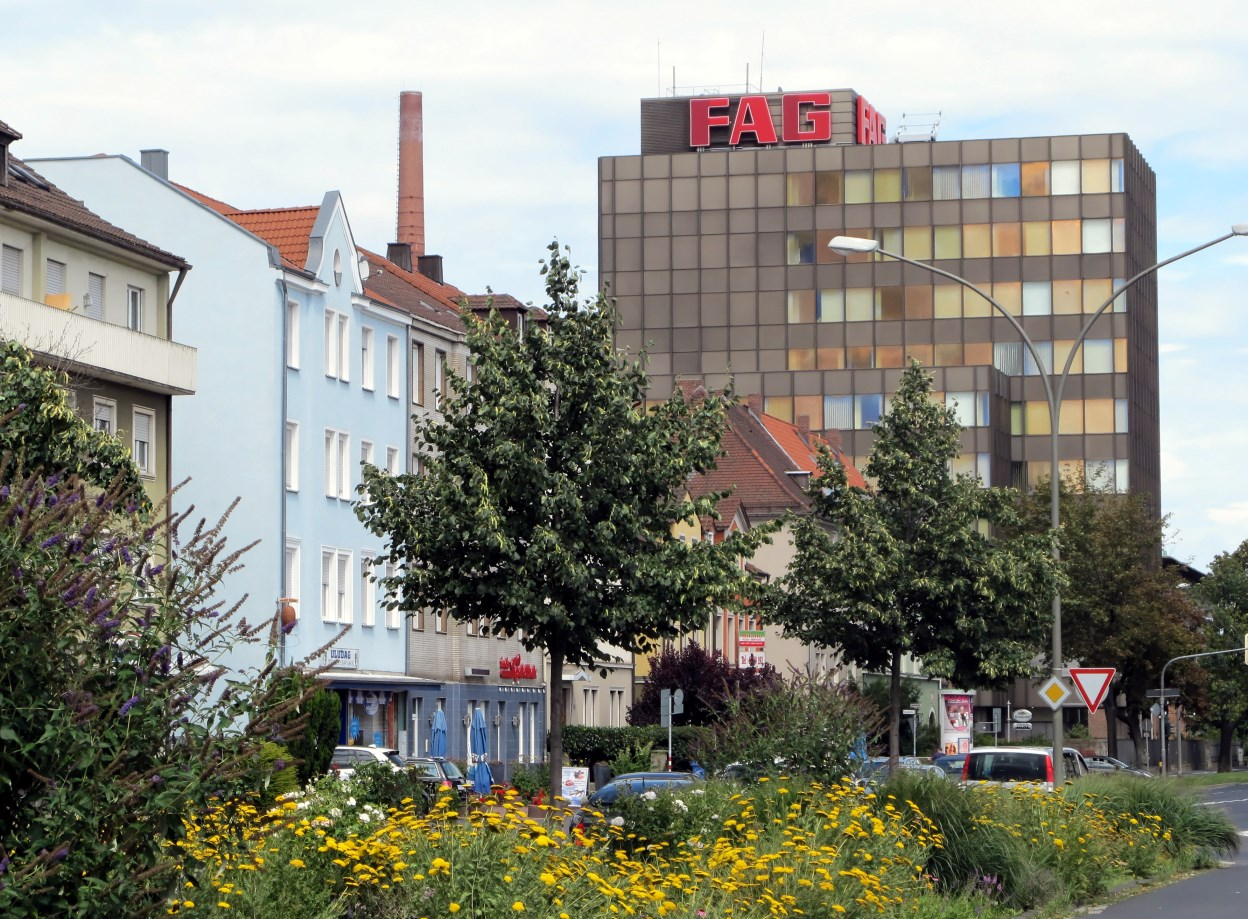
Bürohochhaus von FAG Kugelfischer am Hauptbahnhof, erbaut um 1970

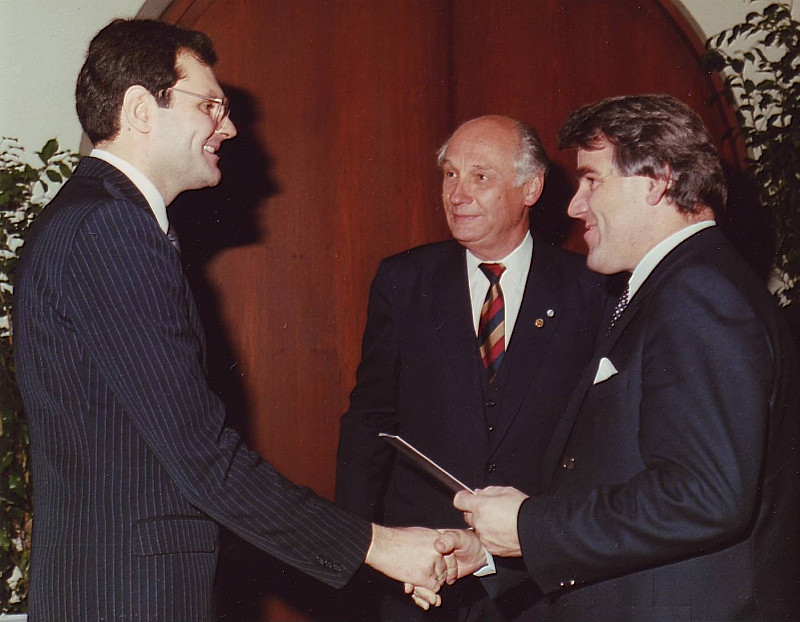
Verleihung des FAG-Preises 1988 mit Georg Schäfer (III) (Mitte)

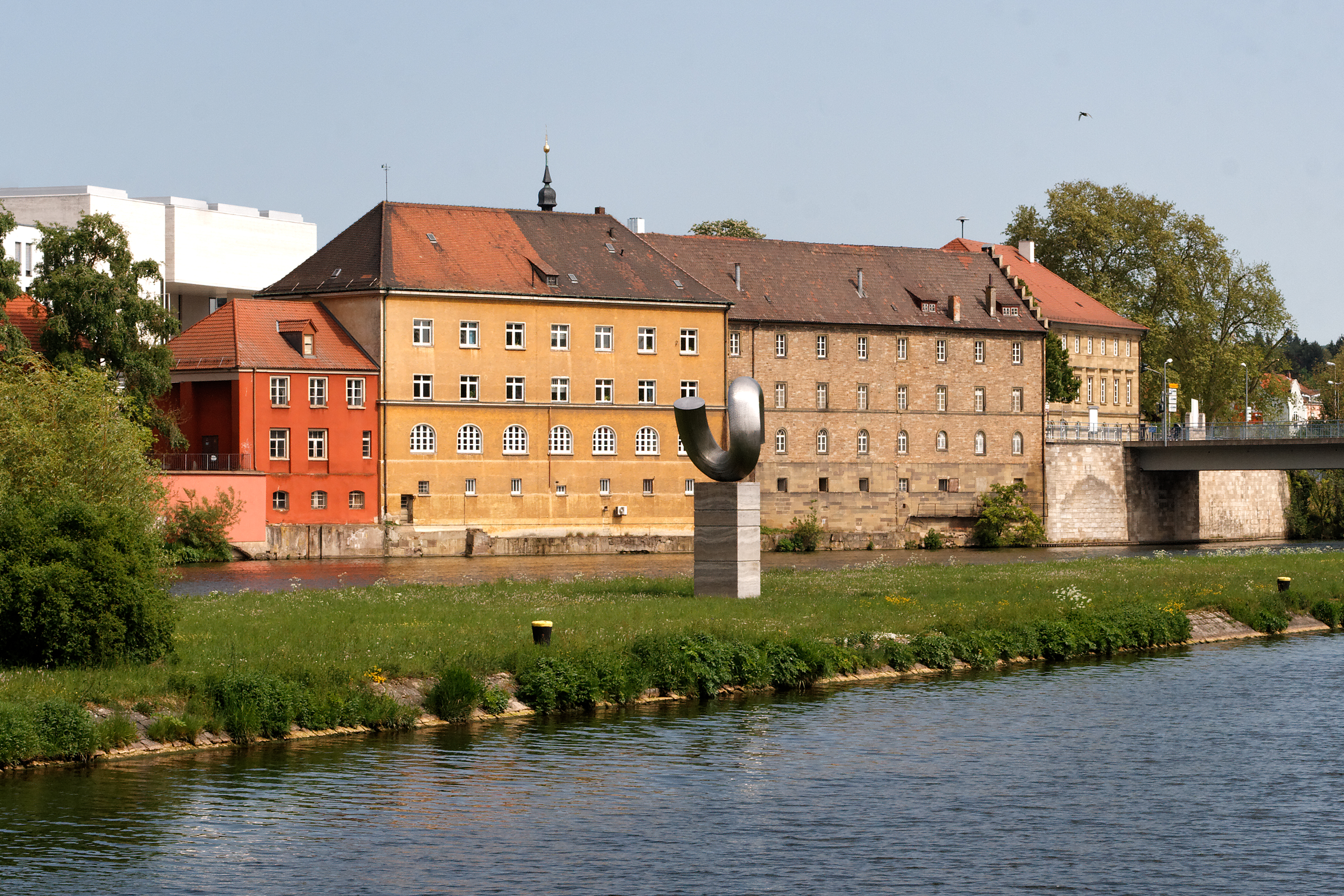
Spinnmühle am Main: Domizil von Fischer und Georg Schäfer (I), heute mit Kleinem Industriemuseum; links dahinter das Museum Georg Schäfer

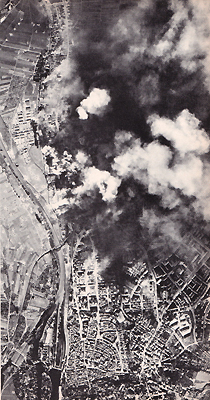
Luftangriff auf das Schweinfurter Industriegebiet 1943, im unteren Bereich der Rauchwolken Kugelfischer

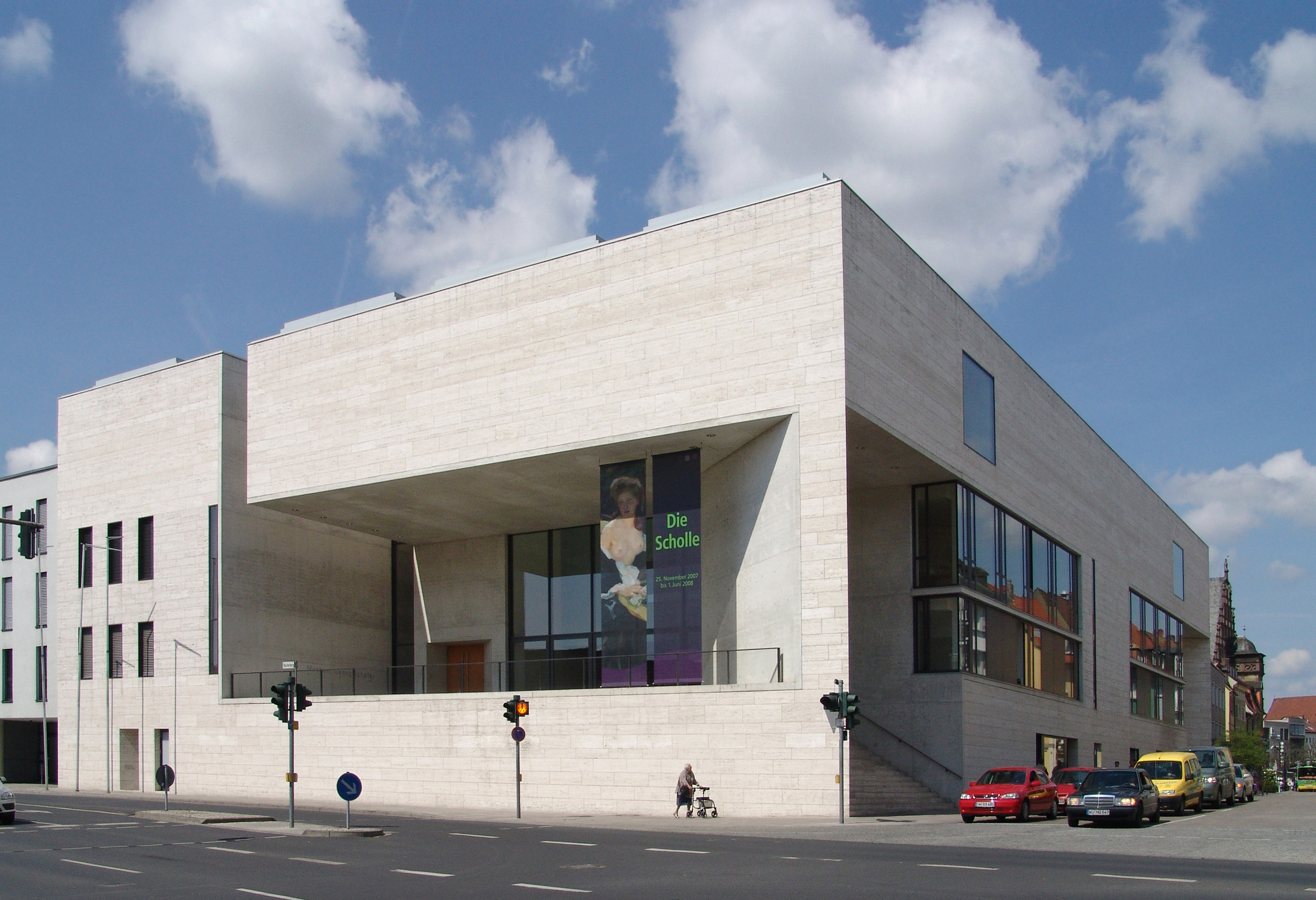
Museum Georg Schäfer
