= Sparx Hockey =

American company that develops and manufactures skate sharpening equipment

- Company type: Private
- Industry: Sporting goods, manufacturing
- Founded: 2013; 13 years ago
- Founder: Russell Layton
- Headquarters: Acton, Massachusetts, U.S.
- Subsidiaries: BladeScan (acquired 2022)
- Website: www.sparxhockey.com

Sparx Hockey is an American company that develops and manufactures skate sharpening equipment for ice hockey, figure skating, and sled hockey. It was founded in 2013 and is based in Acton, Massachusetts.

== History ==
Russell Layton founded Sparx Hockey in 2013. The company introduced its first consumer product, the Sparx Skate Sharpener, in 2016 following a 2015 crowdfunding campaign.

In 2018, the company partnered with former Toronto Maple Leafs goaltender Garret Sparks. Private equity firm North Castle Partners invested in Sparx Hockey in 2020. During the COVID-19 pandemic, Sparx repurposed part of its facilities to produce face shields for healthcare workers.

The company acquired BladeScan, a blade measurement technology firm, in 2022. Its sharpeners have been adopted by hockey programs such as Shattuck-St. Mary’s. In 2023, U.S. Women’s National Team player Taylor Heise donated a Sparx Sharpener to her local hockey program.

In 2024, Sparx Hockey was named the official skate sharpening provider for the Quebec International Pee-Wee Hockey Tournament, and in 2026 for the Minnesota State High School League and its state hockey championships, The Tourney.

In 2026, Sparx Hockey presented at Dassault Systèmes’ 3DEXPERIENCE World conference in Houston.

== Products ==
The company produces automated skate sharpening machines, including the Sparx Sharpener. The system uses interchangeable grinding rings to produce different hollows and automates blade alignment and sharpening.

== Recognition ==
- 2016: Good Design Award from the Chicago Athenaeum Museum of Architecture and Design.
- 2019: Ranked No. 56 on Inc. 500’s list of the 500 fastest-growing U.S. companies.
- 2020: Included on the Inc. 5000 list.
- 2025: Good Design Award from the Chicago Athenaeum Museum of Architecture and Design and the European Centre for Architecture, Art, Design and Urban Studies.
- 2026: iF Design Award for Sparx Sharpener 3 and Sparx BEAM.
