= Race (bearing) =

Track in a bearing along which the rolling elements ride

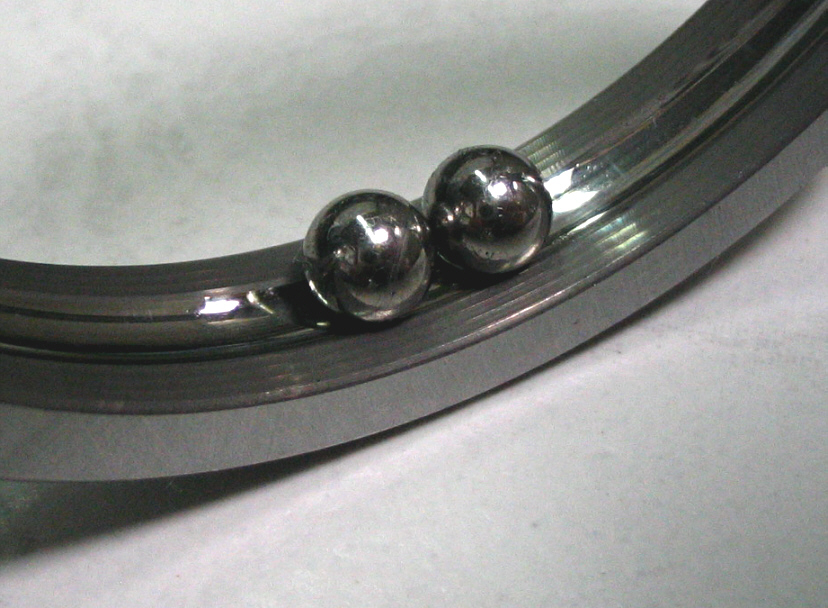
Outer race of ball bearing

The rolling-elements of a rolling-element bearing ride on races. The large race that goes into a bore is called the outer race, and the small race that the shaft rides in is called the inner race.

== Design ==
In the case of ball bearings, the bearing has inner and outer races and a set of balls. Each race is a ring with a groove where the balls rest. The groove is usually shaped so the ball is a slightly loose fit in the groove. Thus, in principle, the ball contacts each race at a single point. However, a load on an infinitely small point would cause infinitely high contact pressure. In practice, the ball deforms (flattens) slightly where it contacts each race, much as a tire flattens where it touches the road. The race also dents slightly where each ball presses on it. Thus, the contact between ball and race is of finite size and has finite pressure. The deformed ball and race do not roll entirely smoothly because different parts of the ball are moving at different speeds as it rolls. Thus, there are opposing forces and sliding motions at each ball/race contact. Overall, these cause bearing drag. "V" groove raceways distribute the load evenly over the balls as they travel on four points of contact, creating a straight line rolling effect and decreasing the amount of friction created by a full contact round groove design.

In some applications the two races may be arranged on plates parallel to the plane of the balls, rather than on inner and outer sleeves. In this case, the inner and outer sides of the grooves that form the race should have different angles with respect to this plane, with a steeper angle on the inside groove and a shallower angle on the outside groove, so that each ball can rotate properly without slipping.

== Manufacture ==
=== Centerless grinding ===
The outer diameter (OD) of the races are often centerless ground using the throughfeed process. Centerless grinding can achieve a very high degree of accuracy, especially when done in stages. These stages are: rough, semi-finish and finish. Each grinding stage is designed to remove enough stock material from the casing so that the next stage does not encounter any problems such as burning or surface chatter, the finish stage achieves the final dimension. Each grinding wheel at all of the aforementioned stages has a varying degree of abrasive quality (finish being the finest grade) to achieve the appropriate stock removal for the next stage and final surface finish required.

=== Feeding ===
Bearing casings are introduced to the grinding action via means of a transfer from the delivery system to a pair of infeed rollers, these infeed rollers are tapered to a certain angle so that the casings are driven forward until the regulating wheel and grinding wheel catch them and slow them to their grinding speed which can be altered by speed control of the regulating wheel. The casings are constantly rotating and are fed into the grinding area to prevent separation which can cause finish/size problems or even a "bump" that can potentially crack or destroy casings and will damage the grinding and regulating wheels.

=== Work rest blade ===
Whilst grinding, the bearing cases run through the grinding stages in one long tube of casings that is showered with a cutting fluid. The 'tube' rests on a hardened steel blade with an angled, highly ground surface held on a horizontal plane between the grinding wheel and regulating wheel, often named a Work Rest Blade. The tube causes wear on the working surface of the blade, so it must be reground at regular intervals. The height of the work rest blade perfectly aligns the bearing casing with the horizontal centreline of the grinding wheel, creating a flawless ground finish. The work rest blade height can be altered using packing bars placed underneath the blade. Height adjustments must be made depending on the diameter of the casings being ground.

=== Inspection ===
Each casing exits the grinding zone onto a high speed conveyor that delivers them to whatever storage and/or inspection arrangement a manufacturer may have, inspection is also carried out by the operator of the centreless line, by checking finish appearance, diameter, squareness and roundness by use of a dial test indicator in varying configurations, size allowances are permitted but are extremely tight depending on the customers requirements and can vary plus or minus within micrometres of finish diameter, Sizes can be adjusted on all grinding stages via a compensation button which can be pushed to remove extra material in varying micrometre units, the grinding wheel can move away at the same compensation to make the casings bigger if so required if the casing size moves from the operators target, and as the grinding wheel wears. Because a centerless grinding line has typically three grinding machines the operator must be in complete control and must prevent blockages in transfers, grinding exits and packing areas, also size and quality must constantly be checked, so the operator is always alert while operating the line and checking for problems and quality issues.

=== Safety ===
Safety features include an emergency stop button which immediately moves the grinding wheel away from the ground rings on its revolutionary axis. Because of the wheel's momentum, it cannot be stopped but the power is cut and the wheel slows naturally. It cannot be reactivated until the emergency stop is reset. After the emergency stop is activated, the size of the workpiece must be re-established before the line can be reactivated into production mode.

=== Finishing ===
The outer and inner bearing casings are then sent on for raceway grinding, superfinishing and final assembly.

== See also ==
- Brinelling – Permanent indentation of a hard surface
- Wire race bearing – Rolling-element bearing, where the balls or rollers run on races resembling loops of wire
