= Slewing bearing =

Rotational support element for directional alignment

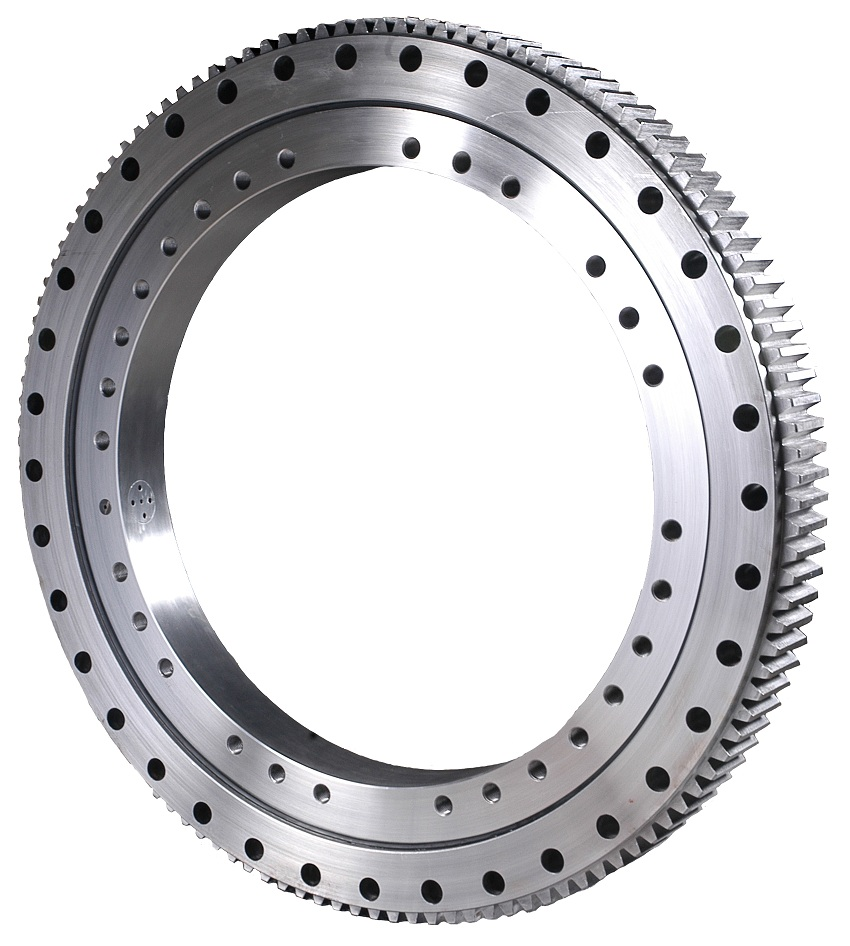
Slewing bearing

A slewing bearing, slew[ing] ring, or turntable bearing is a rotational rolling-element bearing that typically supports heavy, slow-turning, or slowly-oscillating loads in combination. Slewing bearings are often used in horizontal platforms, such as conventional cranes, swing yarders, amusement rides, and wind-facing platforms of horizontal-axis wind turbines. In other orientations (e.g. a horizontal axis of rotation), they are used in materials handling grapples, forklift attachments, and welding turnover jigs.

Compared to a standard ball bearing, slewing bearing rings are quite wide, and usually have holes drilled in them to provide fixation to a structure. Seals can be provided between the rings to protect the rolling elements. Compared to other rolling-element bearings, slewing bearings are relatively thin. Slewing bearings' thinness means that the structure they are bolted to must be stiff enough to not distort the bearing.

Slewing bearings range in size from as little as 100mm in diameter to well over 15,000mm. Large slewing bearings are often segmented for transport and handling. The slewing bearings on the Falkirk Wheel, for example, are 4 meters in diameter, and fit over a 3.5 meter axle. Slewing bearings are often made with gear teeth integral with the inner or outer race used to drive the platform relative to the base.

The core components of a slewing bearing—the inner and outer rings—are typically made from 50Mn steel and 42CrMo steel, Surface hardened steel. The raceway surface is hard and wear‑resistant, while the core retains toughness to resist impact. 50Mn offers good cost‑performance; 42CrMo provides higher strength, suitable for heavy machinery like cranes.

Slewing bearing designs range from single row ball or roller style, through double row ball or roller, triple row roller, combined (1 roller/ 1 ball) or wore guided raceways - each design having its own special characteristics and application. Old designs can have split rings to allow tight control on preload during assembly.

As for other bearings that reciprocate, rather than rotating continuously, lubrication can be difficult. The oil wedge built up in a continuously rotating bearing is disrupted by the stop start motion of slewing. Instead, a hydrostatic bearing with pumped oil flow may be used.

== Standards ==
Most manufacturers of slewing rings have their own set of manufacturing standards. The American Society of Mechanical Engineers (ASME) publishes the following standard:

- ASME SRB-1 on Design, Installation, Maintenance, and Application of Ball Slewing Ring Bearings
