= Timken =

Timken may refer to:

== People ==
- Henry Timken (1831–1909), founder of the Timken Company
- Jane Timken (born 1966), politician
- William R. Timken (born 1938), U.S. ambassador to Germany

== Other ==
- Timken, Kansas, town
- Timken 1111, 4-8-4 steam locomotive built in 1930
- Timken Company, a manufacturer of industrial parts
- Timken High School, in Canton, Ohio, United States
- Timken House, historic house in California
- Timken Museum of Art, fine art museum in San Diego, California, United States
- Timken Roller Bearing Company
