= Metallus =

Metallus may refer to:

- Metallus (sawfly), insect genus in the family Tenthredinidae
- Metallus, unaccepted insect genus in the family Chrysomelidae, synonym of Taumacera
- Metallus, a fictional character from the animated television series Space Ghost
- Metallus, a company formerly known as TimkenSteel and previously part of the Timken Company
