= Phil Murphy =

Governor of New Jersey from 2018 to 2026

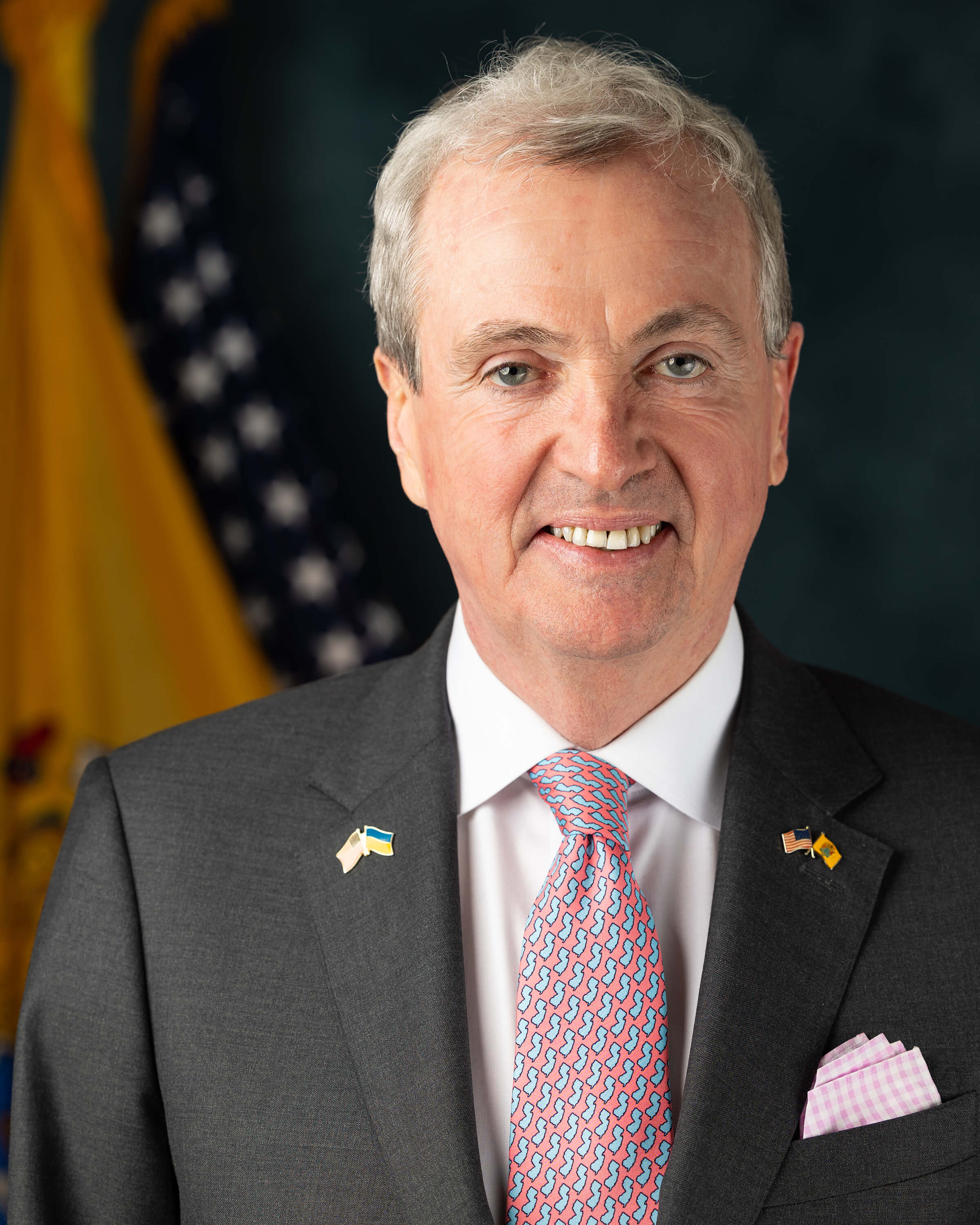
- Official portrait, c. 2023

56th Governor of New Jersey
- In office January 16, 2018 – January 20, 2026
- Lieutenant: Sheila Oliver; Tahesha Way
- Preceded by: Chris Christie
- Succeeded by: Mikie Sherrill

Chair of the National Governors Association
- In office July 15, 2022 – July 14, 2023
- Preceded by: Asa Hutchinson
- Succeeded by: Spencer Cox

United States Ambassador to Germany
- In office September 3, 2009 – August 26, 2013
- President: Barack Obama
- Preceded by: William R. Timken
- Succeeded by: John B. Emerson

Personal details
- Born: Philip Dunton Murphy; August 16, 1957 (age 69) Boston, Massachusetts, U.S.
- Party: Democratic
- Spouse: Tammy Snyder (m. 1993)
- Children: 4
- Education: Harvard University (BA); University of Pennsylvania (MBA)
- Website: Campaign website
- Murphy's voice Murphy and U.S. Rep. Bill Pascrell on NJ Transit. Recorded June 4, 2018

Philip Dunton Murphy (born August 16, 1957) is an American politician, financier, and former diplomat who served from 2018 to 2026 as the 56th governor of New Jersey. A member of the Democratic Party, he was elected governor in 2017 and narrowly reelected in 2021. From 2009 to 2013, Murphy was the U.S. ambassador to Germany.

Born and raised in Massachusetts, Murphy has degrees from Harvard University and the University of Pennsylvania's Wharton School. He had a 23-year career at Goldman Sachs, where he held several high-level positions and accumulated considerable wealth before retiring in 2006. He then became active in politics. He was finance chairman for the Democratic National Committee in the mid-late 2000s under Howard Dean.

While planning to run for governor of New Jersey, Murphy and his wife Tammy Murphy launched New Start New Jersey, a progressive organization. He defeated Republican, then-Lieutenant Governor Kim Guadagno, in the 2017 gubernatorial election with 56% of the vote. Murphy was reelected in an unexpectedly close race with 51.2% of the vote. He is the first Democratic governor of New Jersey to win a second term since Brendan Byrne in 1977.

During Murphy's first term as governor, he signed legislation to legalize cannabis and sports betting and enact automatic voter registration. During the COVID-19 pandemic, he implemented various health measures. During Murphy's second term, his wife Tammy unsuccessfully sought to fill the Senate seat vacated by Bob Menendez. He was succeeded by fellow Democrat Mikie Sherrill.

== Early life and education ==
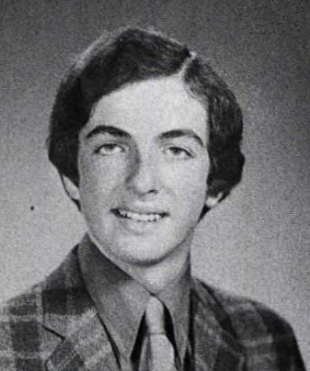
Murphy's high school yearbook photo, 1975

Murphy was born on August 16, 1957, in Boston, Massachusetts, and raised in the nearby towns of Needham and Newton, the son of Dorothy Louise (Dunton) and Walter F. Murphy.

The family was Irish American, with Phil being third generation. According to Murphy, his household was "middle class on a good day;" by his recollection, his mother, a secretary, and father, a high-school dropout who took any job he could (including liquor store manager and for-pay pallbearer), lived paycheck to paycheck.

Both of Murphy's parents were enthusiastic supporters of John F. Kennedy and volunteered for his campaign in the 1952 United States Senate election in Massachusetts. Murphy played soccer as a boy, an interest that stayed with him in later life. His mother believed strongly in the importance of education, and Phil and his three older siblings all earned college degrees.

Murphy graduated from Needham High School, along with future Massachusetts governor Charlie Baker, in 1975. He graduated from Harvard University in 1979 with a Bachelor of Arts degree in economics. At Harvard he aspired to become a professional musical theater performer and was elected president of the Hasty Pudding Theatricals, a theatrical student society. He then attended the University of Pennsylvania's Wharton School, where he received an MBA in 1983.

== Finance career at Goldman Sachs (1982–2003) ==
Murphy began his career in finance with a summer associate internship at Goldman Sachs in 1982. He was hired after graduating in 1983. He rose in the ranks quickly, later attributing that success to his ability to make deals: "Two people may not like each other and can't work together. Their mutual dislike is their problem. I don't let it become mine. I'll be the man in the middle and the three of us can work out something everybody is happy with."

From 1993 to 1997, Murphy headed the firm's Frankfurt office. His business responsibilities were later expanded to encompass Germany, Switzerland, and Austria, as well as in the emerging post-Warsaw Pact economies of Central Europe. In this role he engaged in a number of transactions with the German government's Treuhandanstalt agency, whose purpose was to conduct the privatization of formerly state-owned enterprises within the boundaries of no-longer-extant East Germany. Murphy was also active in the Atlantik-Brücke organization, including co-founding its International Advisor Council.

From 1997 to 1999, Murphy served as the president of Goldman Sachs (Asia). In that capacity, he was officed in Hong Kong. During this time Goldman Sachs profited from its investment in Yue Yuen Industrial Holdings, a shoe manufacturer that became notorious for its harsh labor practices. The $55 million investment was made the year before Murphy took the Asia post and it is unclear to what extent Murphy was aware of the firm's operational characteristics. In 1998 Murphy told The Wall Street Journal that "We [at Goldman Sachs] are elite in the sense the Marine Corps is elite".

In 1999, Murphy secured a spot on the firm's management committee. There his colleagues included Hank Paulson and Gary Cohn, both of whom later served at highest levels of the federal government. This coincided with the repeal of Glass–Steagall; the repeal allowed Murphy and his colleagues to make much greater use of leverage and profoundly changed how the company generated profits.

In 2001, Murphy became global co-head of the firm's Investment Management Division. This unit oversaw the investments of foundations, pensions, hedge funds, and wealthy personages, and by 2003 had amassed $373 billion in holdings. Hedge funds, in particular, received large lines of credit from Murphy's unit. Another company initiative that Murphy helped to undertake was the unit that did major business in the emerging markets within the EMEA region.

In 2003, Murphy's day-to-day responsibilities at the firm ended, and he became a Senior Director of the firm. He retired in 2006. Murphy spent 23 years at Goldman Sachs in all.

== Early government and political career ==
=== Chair of the New Jersey Benefits Task Force ===
In May 2005, Governor Richard Codey named Murphy to chair the New Jersey Benefits Task Force on public sector employee benefits in response to the New Jersey pension crisis, a particularly long-running instance of the state-level pensions crises taking place nationwide. The task force reported its findings in December 2005. By this time Murphy was already considered to be retired from Goldman Sachs. The report decried past state practices, saying that "gimmicks" had been constructed instead of genuine solutions.

As chair, Murphy recommended the sale of publicly owned assets. For the most part that did not happen, but some of his other suggestions, such as raising the age of retirement and recalculating how pensions related to salary earned, were taken. Labor unions opposed the recommendations, with leader Carla Katz saying, "We will fight vigorously and loudly against any cuts to our pensions or health benefits proposed by the task force." The New York Times wrote that "no matter what happens, the report's legacy may well be that it tried to tackle the issues head-on."

=== Finance chair of the Democratic Party ===
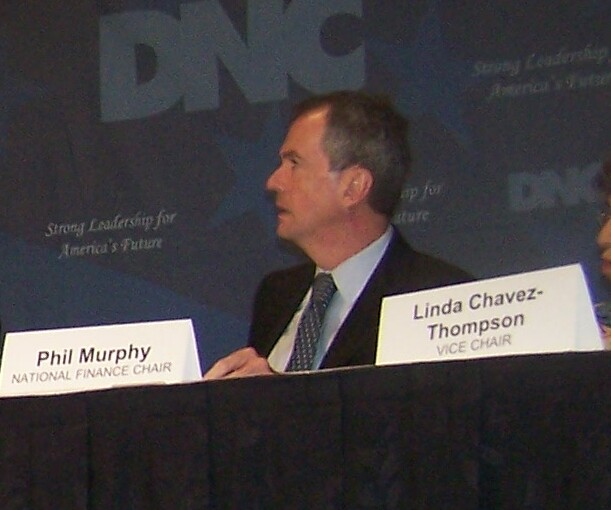
Murphy at the 2007 Democratic National Committee fall meeting

After leaving Goldman Sachs, Murphy served from 2006 to 2009 as the National Finance Chair of the Democratic National Committee (DNC), where he worked with DNC Chair Howard Dean. Murphy liked both Dean's vision for the party and the discipline Dean brought to the task, and the two became close friends.

It was Murphy who financed Dean's "50-state strategy". Powerful Democrats in Congress such as Charles Schumer and Rahm Emanuel opposed the strategy, but Murphy refused to engage in this dispute publicly, saying, "I'm a sucker for the view that you have it out in the locker room, not in public." Former Goldman Sachs colleague and U.S. Secretary of the Treasury Robert Rubin said of Murphy's ability to handle the new position, "He has very substantial technical expertise from his corporate finance work, but he combines that with a wonderful facility for dealing with people." Dean later said that Murphy well learned the lesson not all such figures of commerce understand: that while in business you can command people to do things, in politics things are never so simple.

During his first year, Murphy focused on gaining donations from his contacts from his university years and Goldman Sachs; within that year he was able to substantially reduce the DNC's gap with the Republican National Committee. In all, Murphy says he raised $300 million for the DNC.

Murphy was also a big donor to Democratic candidates, giving them almost $1.5 million by 2009. This included modest contributions to individual candidates and several six-figure sums to party committees. During the hotly contested 2008 Democratic presidential primaries he was a superdelegate but remained uncommitted for most of the contest.

== Ambassadorship ==
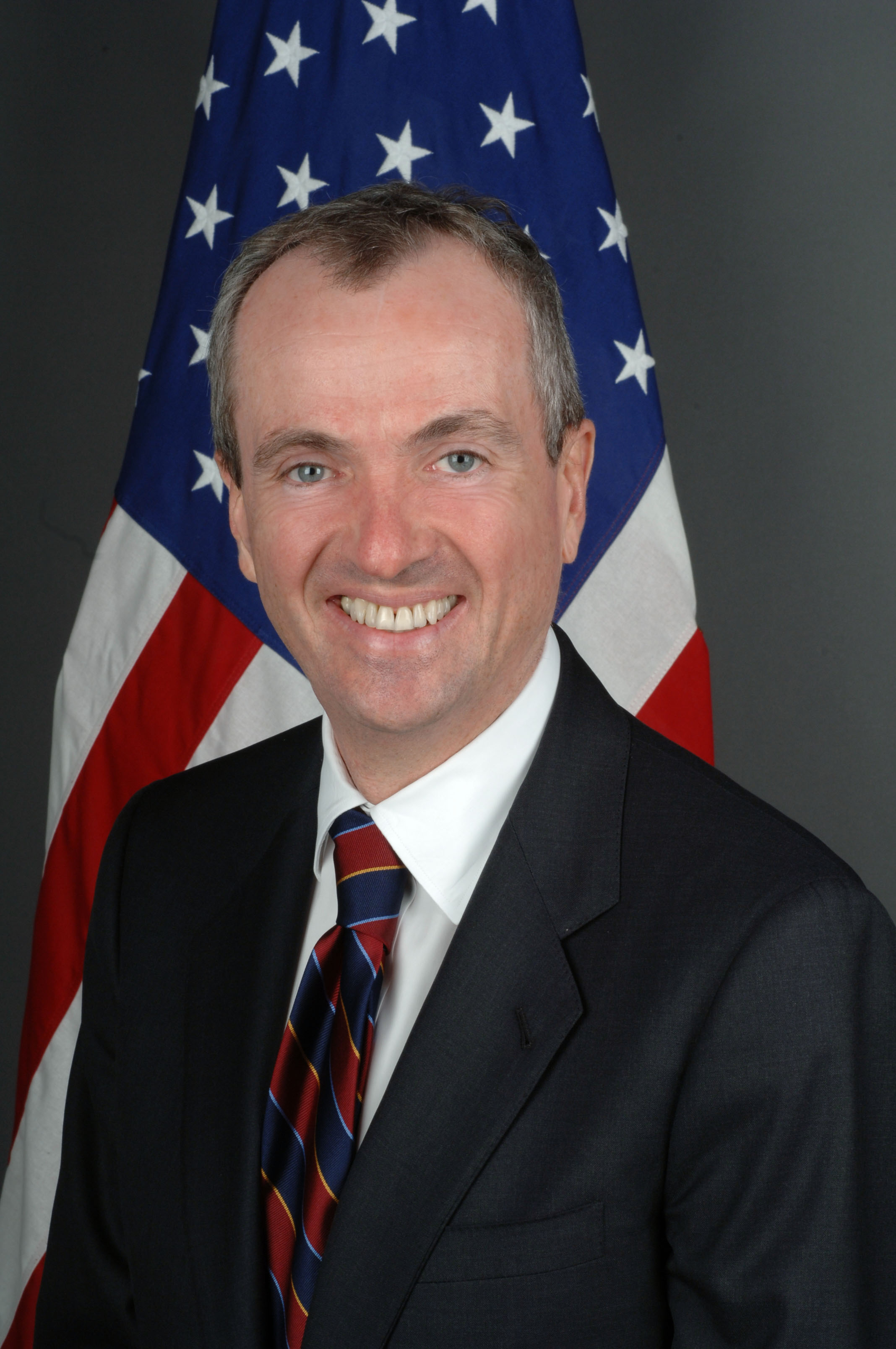
Murphy's official ambassadorial portrait

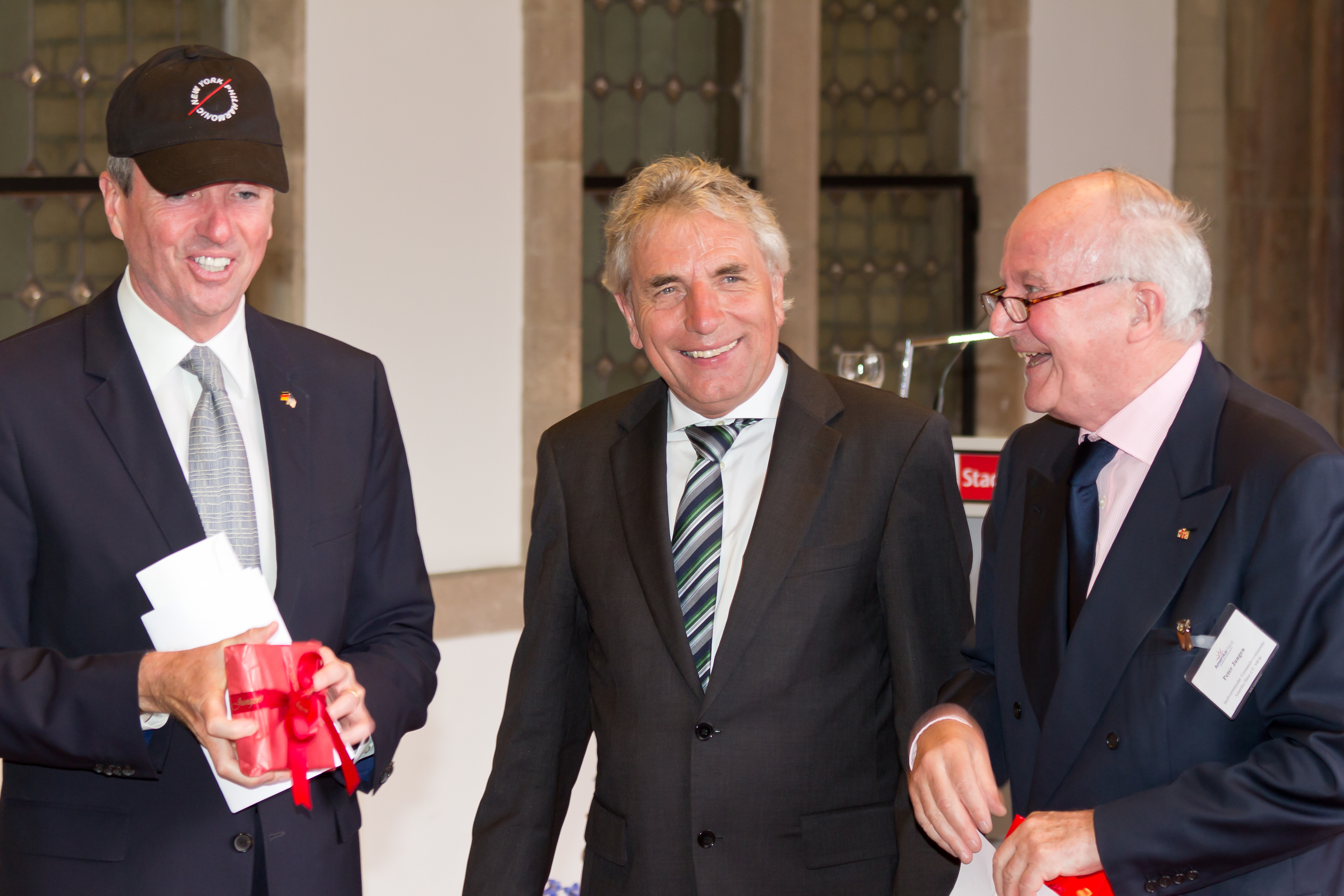
Ambassador Murphy receiving gifts in Köln in mid-2013 near the end of his tenure. Also visible are Peter Jungen (right) and Mayor Jürgen Roters

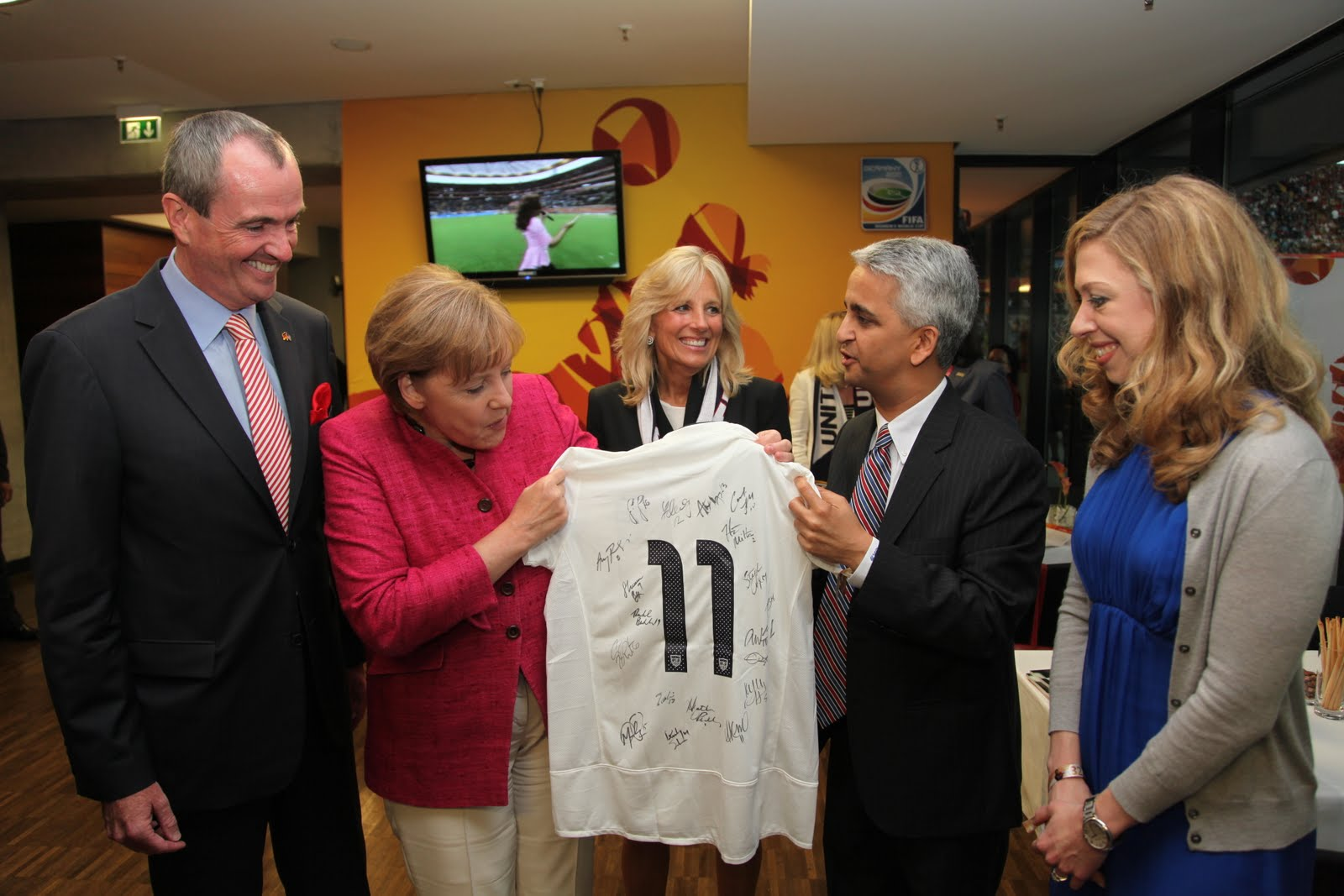
Ambassador Murphy and Sunil Gulati presenting an autographed shirt of the U. S. National Team to Chancellor Angela Merkel at the 2011 Women's World Cup as Jill Biden and Chelsea Clinton looks on

Murphy served as United States Ambassador to Germany under President Barack Obama from 2009 to 2013. The possibility of his being named to the post was first reported by Spiegel Online International in May 2009. The former U.S. Ambassador John Kornblum supported the choice, saying, "Murphy has been involved in German-American relations for many years. He's a good choice." An agrément was issued, and Obama formally nominated him to the position on July 9. Murphy was confirmed by the United States Senate on August 7, and appeared with his family in Berlin on August 21. That they arrived in an expensive Gulfstream V executive jet irked Chancellor Merkel, who saw it as evidence of the long practice of presidents awarding wealthy donors with ambassadorships. Murphy presented his credentials in Berlin to German President Horst Koehler on September 3, which the State Department considers his effective start date. He was sworn into the position on September 13.

The United States diplomatic cables leak contained negative statements Murphy signed about senior German politicians, including a remark by Murphy that Merkel was "insecure" and unfavorable comments by embassy staff about Guido Westerwelle, the German foreign minister. Some German officials expressed desire that Murphy be recalled. In response, Murphy appeared on German television outlets such as ZDF in an attempt at damage control. In Spiegel Online, he said, "I'm a big boy. At the end of the day, the buck stops with me," and that he would not "apologize for one speck" of what his staff had done. On December 5, he apologized for the leak in Welt am Sonntag. Murphy later said that the episode was "incredibly awkward and embarrassing" but that the two countries worked through it, and that in the end Germany-United States relations were stronger than ever.

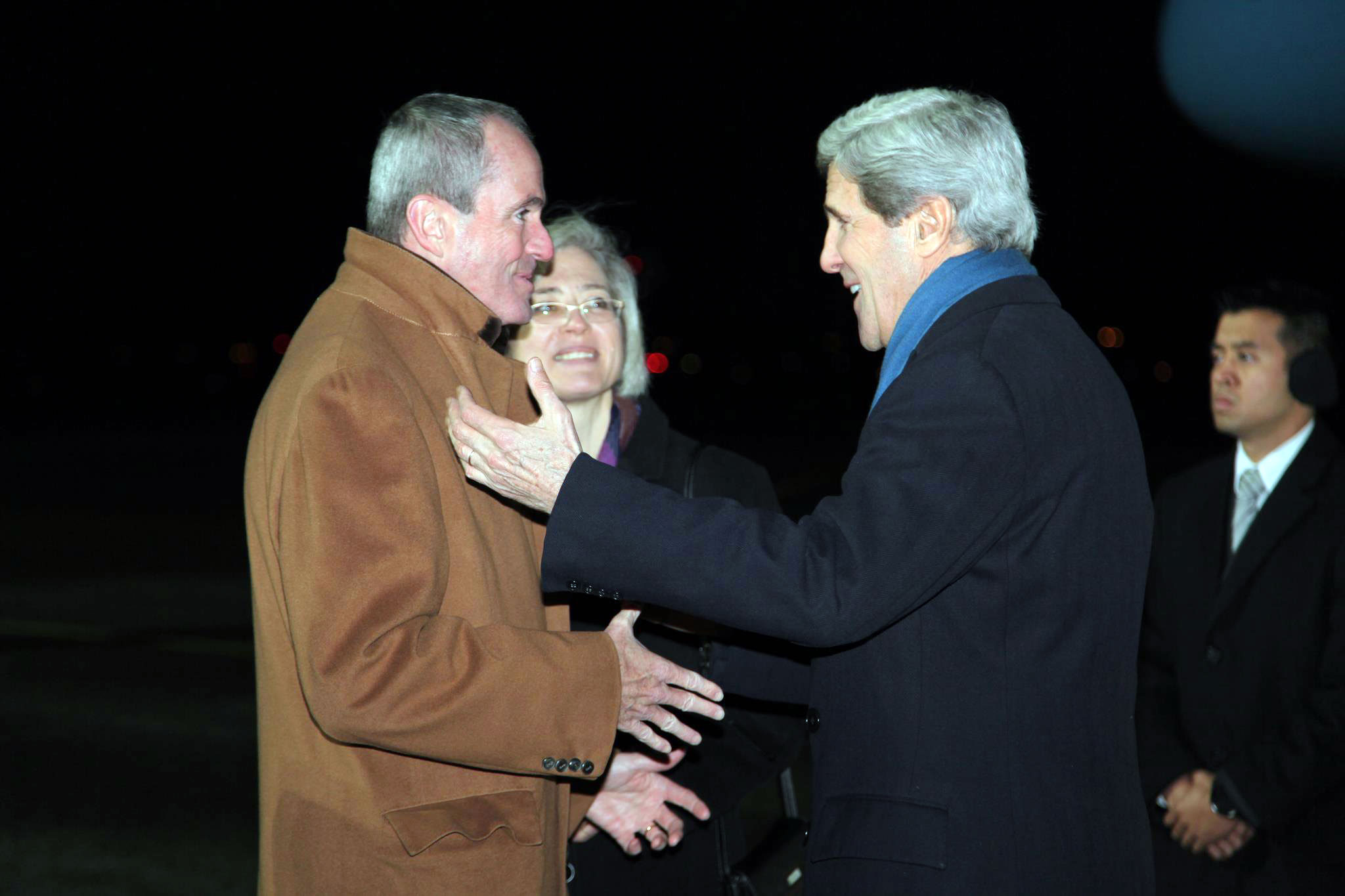
Ambassador Murphy greeting Secretary of State John Kerry upon arrival in Berlin early in 2013

Regarding the European debt crisis, Murphy said in 2013, "The big debate in Europe, which I think is a false debate, is either fiscal consolidation or growth. And the reality is that Europe needs both: it needs fiscal consolidation and growth." Regarding economic differences between the nations, he said, "Germany believes strongly that the first order of business is to cut your debts and deficits and from that, good things will come. We're more likely to say a little bit of stimulus will jump-start things, even if it means incurring more debt. But you work your way through those issues."

On May 29, 2013, it was announced that Murphy was stepping down from the post. He was still ambassador as of July 3; he returned to the United States at some point during July and formally stayed in the role until his mission terminated on August 26.

== Post-ambassadorship ==
Murphy was mentioned as a potential candidate in the 2013 New Jersey gubernatorial election, but did not run. Instead, upon returning to the U.S. after his ambassadorship, he rejoined Murphy Endeavors LLC (a business management consultancy firm with offices in Red Bank, New Jersey, at which he was the principal). He started the firm in 2009 after leaving the DNC position, but it was soon put on hold due to his ambassadorial nomination. He also gave speeches about his experiences in Germany, especially in connection with the 25th anniversary of the fall of the Berlin Wall.

In 2014, Murphy created New Start New Jersey, a nonprofit progressive policy think tank that held a number of events around New Jersey. His wife was co-founder, chair, and secretary. The organization said it would neither endorse nor fund political candidates, as it was barred from doing so, but it raised Murphy's political visibility. Its events included an appearance by singer Jon Bon Jovi. One of its goals was to help displaced workers back into the work force. (Making reference to visibility, in 2016 hacked Podesta emails revealed that Murphy was already seriously considering running for governor when the organization was founded, telling Podesta that his ambitions were "very serious but not yet committed" and that the new entity would improve his name recognition.)

After Murphy announced his candidacy for governor, New Start New Jersey continued, albeit without Murphy on its board.

In September 2015, Murphy launched the progressive organization New Way for New Jersey, which held a number of town halls, including some by telephone on Sunday evenings, and encouraged Democrats to sign petitions critical of incumbent Governor Chris Christie. Unlike New Start New Jersey, New Way for New Jersey was an explicitly political organization.

On March 2, 2016, New Way for New Jersey launched a petition that criticized Christie for neglecting his duties as governor due to his travel and support of Donald Trump's presidential campaign. The group implored Christie to "do your job or quit".

After Murphy announced his candidacy for governor, New Way for New Jersey folded.

== Gubernatorial campaigns ==
=== 2017 ===
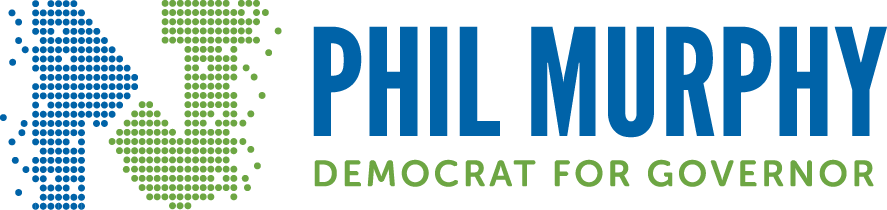
Campaign logo

In May 2016 Murphy announced his candidacy for the Democratic nomination in the 2017 New Jersey gubernatorial election. He became the race's first announced candidate. He said of his rationale, "I am running for governor because New Jersey desperately needs adult leadership that puts our people first."

Announcing so early was unusual. Comparisons with unpopular former governor Jon Corzine, another wealthy former Goldman Sachs executive, were a challenge Murphy had to meet. Murphy also began the campaign with little name recognition. He initially planned to lend $10 million to the campaign but to also aggressively fund-raise. He said he would accept no so-called dark money and that "I'm holding our campaign to a higher standard."

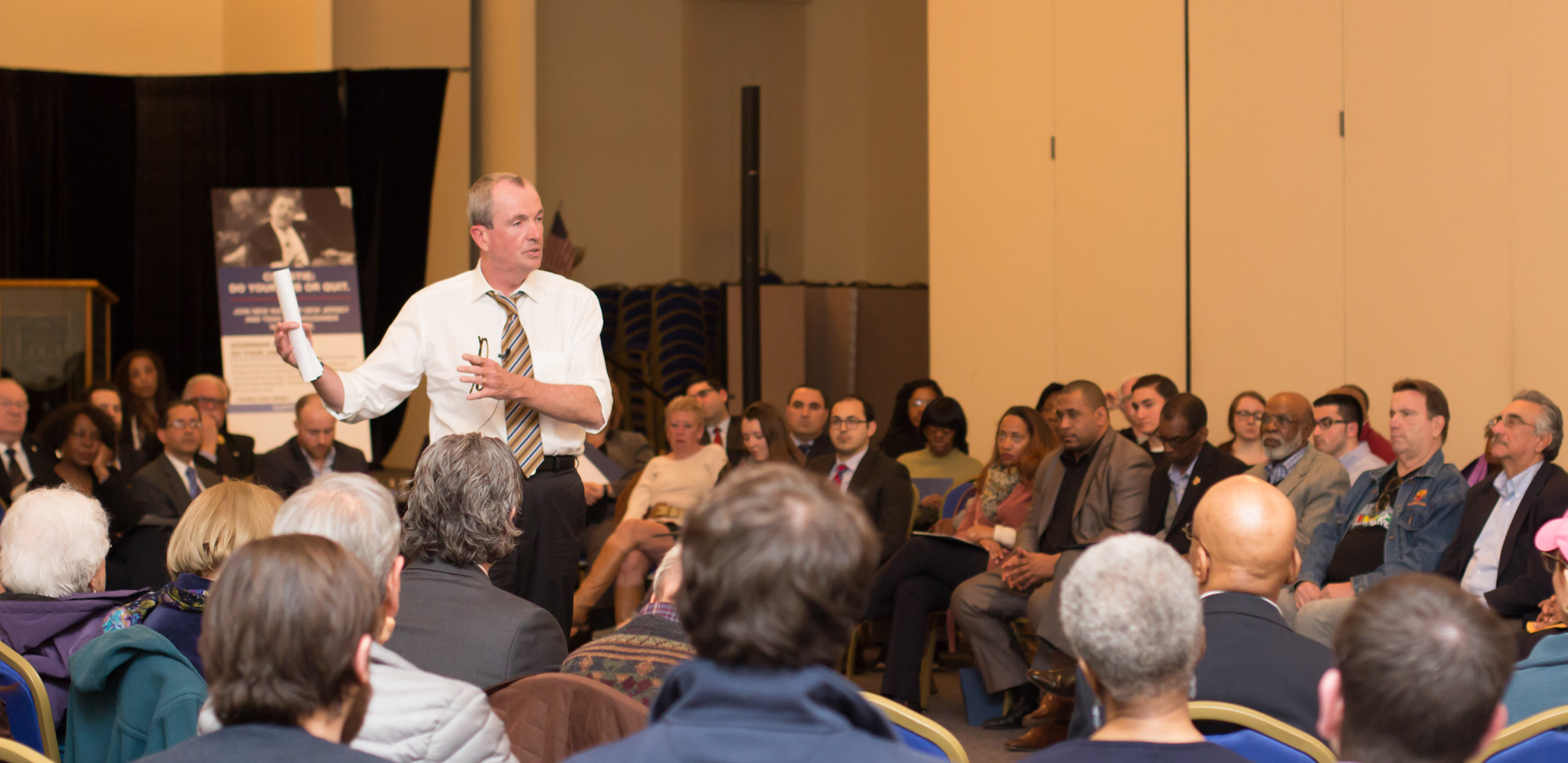
Murphy holding a campaign event

Murphy was the first declared Democratic candidate for governor, although several other candidates were expected to run. Jersey City Mayor Steven Fulop, Assemblyman John Wisniewski of Sayreville, State Senator Raymond Lesniak, and State Senate President Stephen M. Sweeney of Gloucester County were often mentioned in news media along with other candidates. Fulop and Sweeney were geographic rivals, and in terms of state party organizational support, Max Pizarro of the New York Observer characterized Murphy as "everyone's number two choice. If Fulop or Sweeney stumbles, Murphy could rocket from zero to 100 overnight."

On September 28, 2016, Fulop announced he would not run for governor and endorsed Murphy. On October 6, Sweeney announced he too would not run, citing apparent party support for Murphy, whom he endorsed. The move came as Murphy was corralling dozens of endorsements, including all of those from North Jersey county party committees and the most populous Central Jersey county committees.

As a result of these withdrawals Murphy became the clear front-runner for the nomination, but Wisniewski and Lesniak, the two best-known remaining potential candidates, both said they still intended to run.

After the unexpected result of the 2016 United States presidential election, Murphy noted that the fortunes of the state Democratic Party had improved in the election, saying, "As with so many, I am disappointed by the [presidential] results from Tuesday. But I refuse to be discouraged. And I won't be dissuaded from working to make New Jersey a fairer, more just place for all of us." Murphy subsequently drew criticism from the New Jersey Lieutenant Governor and Republican candidate for governor, Kim Guadagno, for seeming to draw a comparison between the Trump campaign and the early years of the Nazi rise to power in Germany.

On November 15, Wisniewski, who gained visibility as a leader of the Fort Lee lane closure scandal investigations, announced his run for governor. In his message he implicitly criticized Murphy, saying "I'm not a Wall Street executive. I haven't made hundreds of millions of dollars by outsourcing jobs. I've learned the value of public service..."

In January 2017 Murphy was endorsed by New Jersey's two U.S. senators, Bob Menendez and Cory Booker. He also had the endorsements of all 21 county party organizations. In statewide races, these designations offer favorable ballot position, which some voters pick by default, and are often central to success.

By February 2017 Murphy was leading by a solid margin in a Quinnipiac Poll both for the Democratic nomination and in a putative general election matchup against Guadagno. Another poll was less certain, showing most voters undecided.

Two debates with his main Democratic rivals, including former U.S. Treasury official Jim Johnson along with Wiesiewski and Lesniak, were held within a short span of time in May; during the second Murphy found himself under sustained attack by his rivals, but defended himself by staking out very progressive positions. Politico wrote, "Underdogs Jim Johnson, Ray Lesniak and John Wisniewski savaged the front-runner, Phil Murphy, accusing him during the 90-minute televised contest of buying off party bosses and being disingenuous on environmental issues." Subsequent campaigning by those three continued to emphasize that Murphy was "buying" the election. Nonetheless, polls continued to show Murphy with a sizable lead over all rivals.

With $19 million raised, of which $15 million was his own money, Murphy continued to spend the most of all the candidates; his spending was more than twice that of all the other Democratic and Republican candidates for governor combined. He also donated $1.5 million to the various county party organizations as well as to some candidates for local offices. Murphy captured the endorsement of the first major national figure to inject himself into the race, former Vice President Joe Biden. Additionally, he was endorsed by former Vice President Al Gore, which helped solidify Murphy's environmentalist credentials after some attacks on his role as a financier investing in fracking operations. He also had the fundraising support of wealthy entertainment figures Jon Bon Jovi and Whoopi Goldberg. Most, though not all, of the key labor unions in the state, also supported Murphy. Nevertheless, there was still a sense of apathy about the election on the part of the state's voters; as the New York Times stated shortly before the primary vote, "a majority of voters still say they 'don't know' who to vote for and are not doing much to find out."

Murphy won the June 6 primary decisively, with 48% of the vote. Johnson and Wisniewski finished second and third with 22% apiece, Lesniak got 5%, and scattered others less.

Murphy faced Guadagno, the Republican nominee, in the November general election. In that campaign Guadagno ran as a moderate, attempting to avoid association with both Christie, who held a record-low approval rating for a governor, and Donald Trump. Instead she sought to focus on Murphy's Goldman Sachs background.

On July 26, Murphy announced Assemblywoman and Speaker Emerita Sheila Oliver as his running mate.

Murphy won the general election with approximately 56% of the vote, an overall percentage similar to the previous winning non-incumbent Democrat, Jim McGreevey, for said office (2001; 56.4%), almost completely wiping out the unusually large gains made by his predecessor, Chris Christie, in 2013 (60.3% of the vote - only the normally Democratic counties of Essex and Hudson voted for Christie's opponent, Barbara Buono; by contrast, Murphy won normally Democratic municipalities by margins more similar to Jon Corzine's in 2005, and pull roughly 50/50 Somerset County into the Democratic column for the first time since 1989.

Murphy campaigned on the following policy proposals:

- State bank: Murphy's campaign has suggested a North Dakota-style statewide investment bank as a way of boosting New Jersey's economy. The bank would supply loans to not just businesses but also college students. Moreover, it would have the effect of eliminating Wall Street firms – including his own former one – from participating in state financial activities.
- Pensions: regarding the state's still-troubled pension system, Murphy has said that there are no easy answers but that "the state has to stand up for its side of the bargain. Period. If the state doesn't, there is no use having the second-paragraph discussion."
- Marijuana: Murphy favors the legalization of recreational marijuana in New Jersey.
- Minimum wage: In terms of employment under the law, Murphy supports the notion of a $15 minimum wage. He also favors guaranteed paid sick leave in New Jersey.
- Affordable housing/builder's remedy debate: In summer 2017, amid heavy local outcry over overdevelopment of apartment complexes and concerns about wealthy developers exploiting the Mount Laurel doctrine to overbuild small towns, Murphy proposed a solution that would not require more forced building. "With smart investments, we can create thousands of units of much-needed affordable housing without building a single new building," he said.
- School desegregation. In 2018, members of Murphy's transition team filed a school desegregation lawsuit, Latino Action Network v. New Jersey.

=== 2021 ===
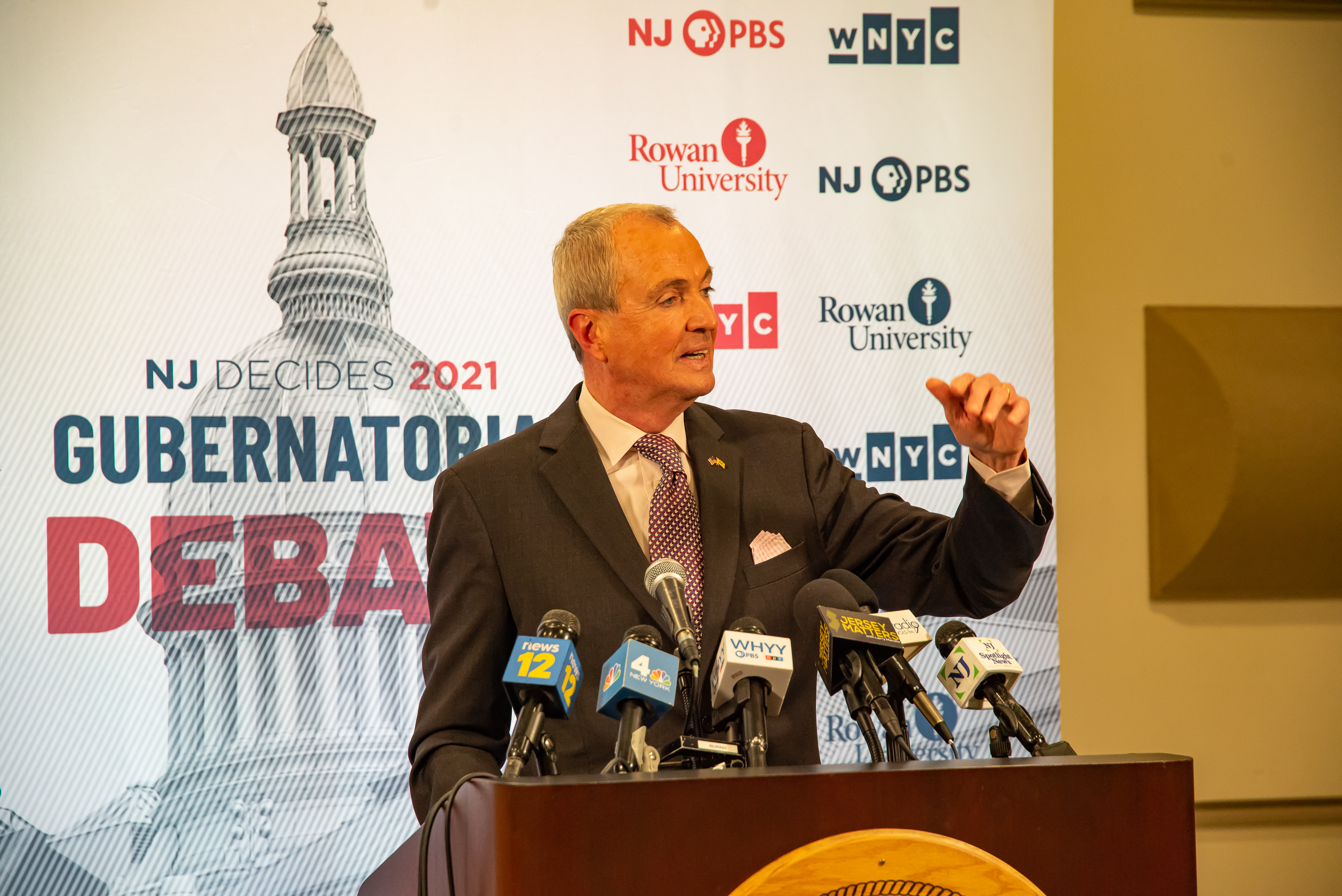
Murphy speaks to the press following the second gubernatorial debate at Rowan University on October 12, 2021.

On October 1, 2020, Murphy announced he would seek reelection, with Oliver as his running mate. He ran unopposed in the 2021 Democratic primary after two challengers were disqualified. He defeated Republican nominee Jack Ciattarelli in the general election, albeit by much closer margin than in 2017, with his campaign harmed by the long duration of some of his COVID-19 executive orders. Murphy became New Jersey's first Democratic governor to be reelected since Brendan Byrne in 1977.

== Governorship ==
On January 16, 2018, Murphy was sworn in as the 56th governor of New Jersey at the Trenton War Memorial, succeeding Chris Christie. In one of his first executive orders, Murphy signed to revive subsidies for wind power in the state. The next month, he signed legislation committing New Jersey to the Paris Agreement, an international treaty on climate change. Murphy also ensured that the state sued the U.S. Environmental Protection Agency for suspending the Clean Water Rule. In March, he signed legislation that automatically registers anyone who applies for a driver's license or state ID to vote. By June, Murphy had signed legislation to permit sports betting in the state. In December, he signed into law new legislation that overhauled the way NJ Transit is managed.

In April 2019, Murphy signed a law allowing terminally ill patients with less than six months to live to choose to end their lives with a doctor's assistance. A month later, he signed legislation expanding the time period during which alleged sexual assault victims could sue their alleged attackers. In June, Murphy signed a law restricting the use of solitary confinement in New Jersey prisons. In October, he announced his opposition to the construction of a new power plant in New Jersey Meadowlands in North Bergen.

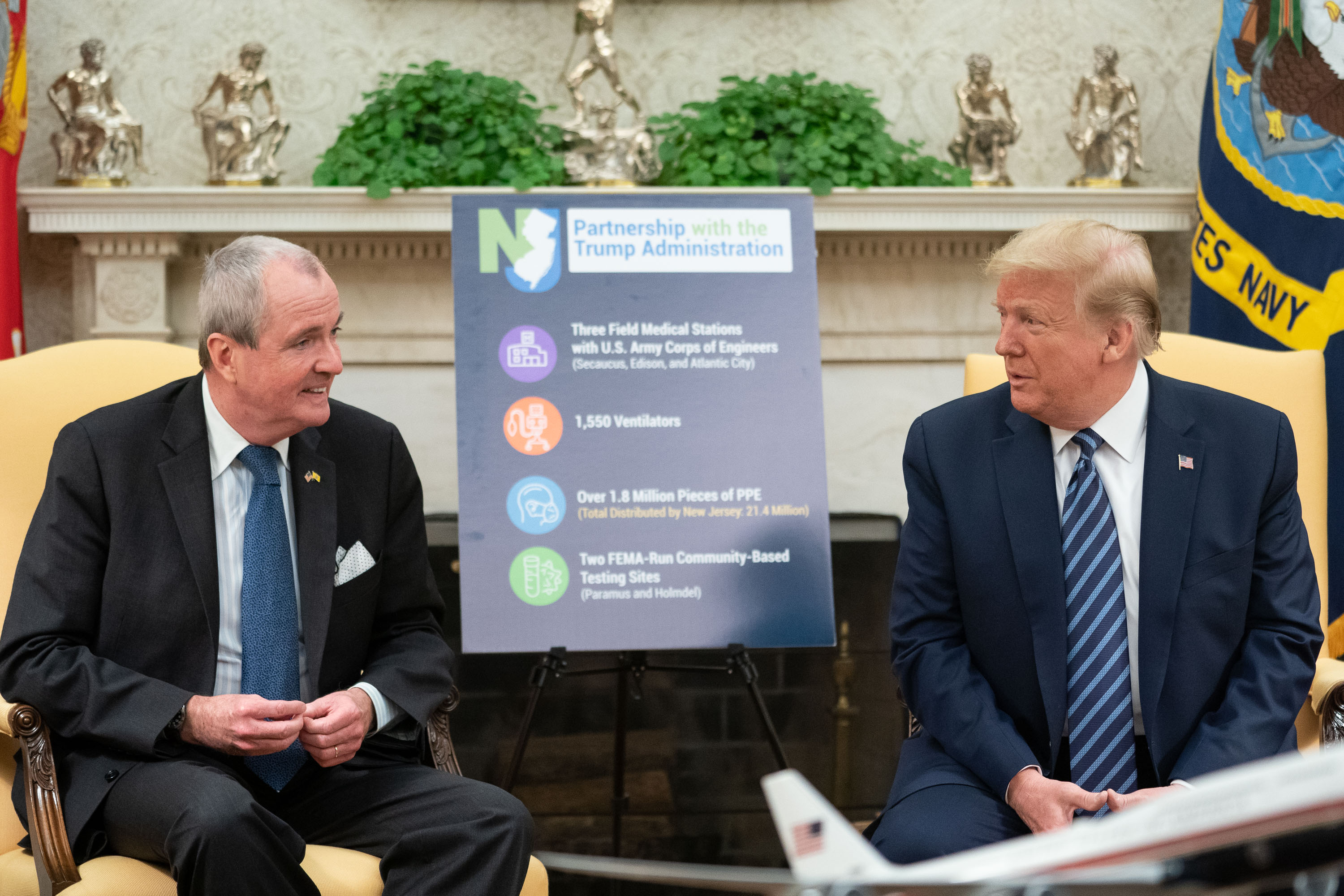
Murphy meets with President Donald Trump in April 2020

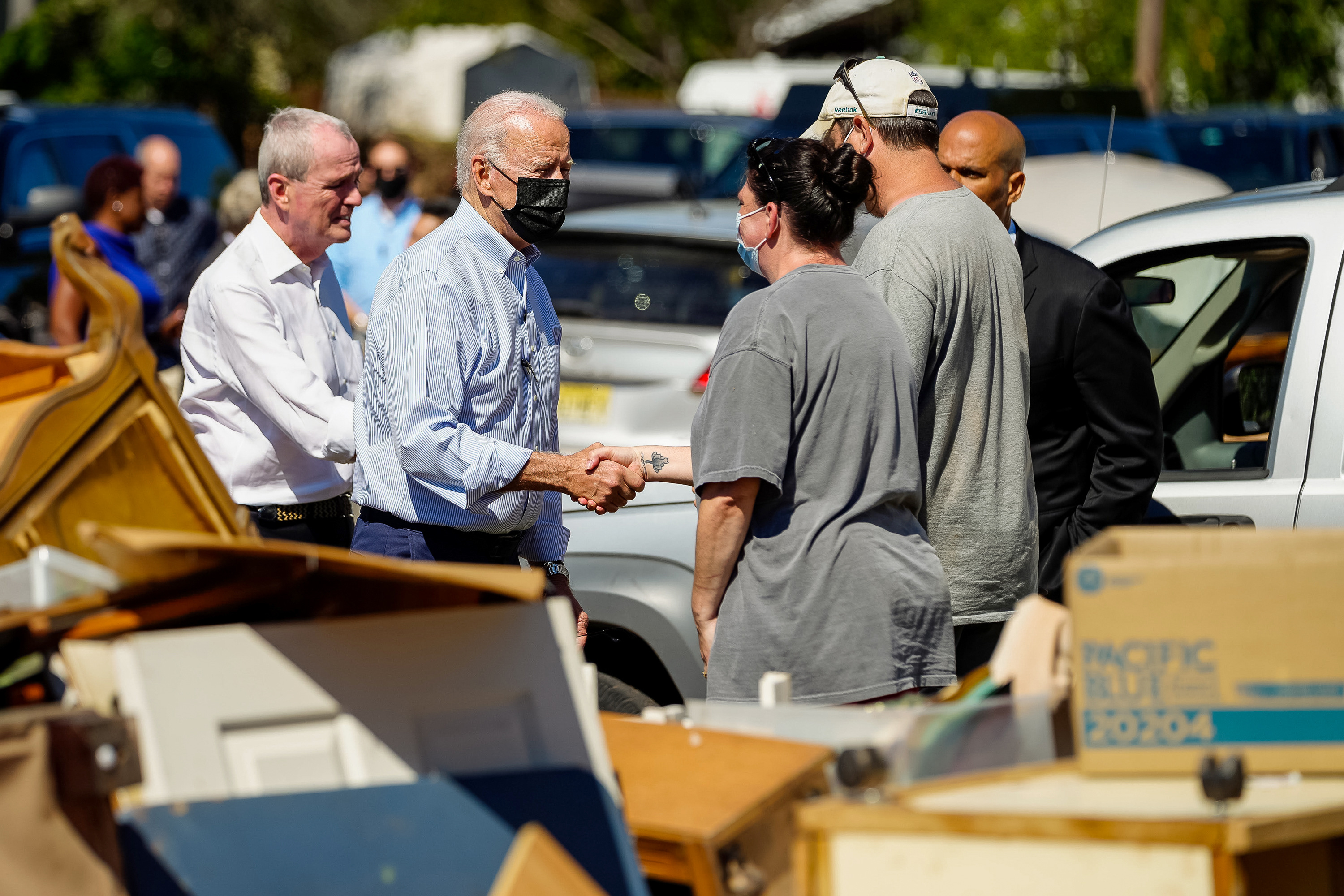
Murphy with President Joe Biden in September 2021

In 2020, Murphy's governorship was dominated by the COVID-19 pandemic. The first case in the state was reported on March 5, and Murphy declared a state of emergency on March 9. He signed multiple executive orders in late March that ordered a lockdown of the entire state. By April, most schools and businesses had shut down, with students required to learn from home. By summer, Murphy had reopened most restaurants but imposed extensive mask mandates. By July, COVID-related deaths in the state neared 16,000 and over 100,000 residents had tested positive.

In the 2020 United States presidential election, Murphy initially endorsed New Jersey senator Cory Booker for the Democratic nomination. After Booker dropped out of the race in January 2020, Murphy announced he did not intend to endorse any of the candidates still in the race. After former vice president Joe Biden won the nomination, Murphy endorsed Biden.

In February 2021, Murphy signed multiple bills that liberalized the state's cannabis laws. The bills created a regulated cannabis industry in the state, permitted residents to carry up to six ounces of cannabis, and expunged 250,000 low-level cannabis arrests. Under the new laws, the scent of alcohol or cannabis can no longer be used to justify a search by law enforcement. In June, Murphy signed an executive order ending the COVID public health emergency while retaining some executive privileges and restrictions. After his reelection in November, Murphy said he intended to have every child in school by winter.

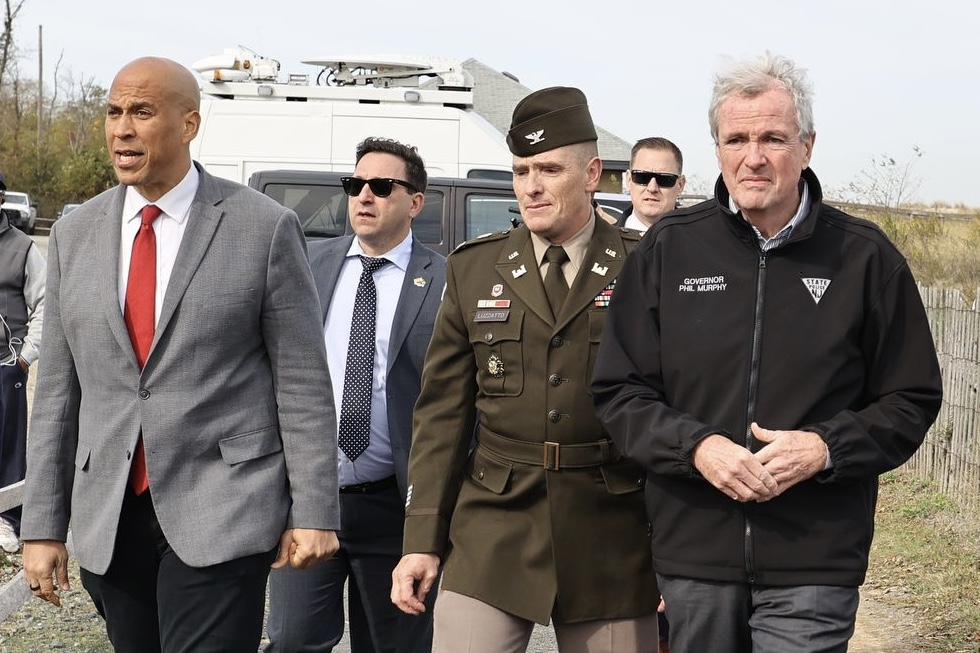
Murphy walking with Senator Cory Booker alongside security, October 2022

In July 2022, Murphy was elected chair of the National Governors Association, becoming the first person from New Jersey to hold the office.

In April 2023, Murphy intervened in the 2023 Rutgers University strike, inviting union representatives and the university administration to his office to negotiate. The strike ended after five days of negotiations led by Murphy. Murphy signed an executive order that would require all state departments and agencies to protect patients and health care professionals against legal repercussions for providing, receiving, assisting in providing or receiving, seeking, and traveling to New Jersey for gender-affirming health care services.

From July 28 to August 13, 2023, Murphy went on vacation, during which time Lieutenant Governor Sheila Oliver became acting governor. On July 31, Oliver was rushed to the Cooperman Barnabas Medical Center for a medical emergency; she died on August 1. New Jersey Senate President Nicholas Scutari served as acting governor until Murphy returned. On September 8, Murphy appointed secretary of State Tahesha Way lieutenant governor.

After United States Senator Bob Menendez resigned on August 20, 2024, Murphy appointed George Helmy, who had been Murphy's chief of staff from 2019 to 2023, to finish Menendez's term. In November, Representative Andy Kim was elected to replace Menendez, and Helmy promptly resigned so Kim could take his seat.

In December 2024, Murphy signed a bill prohibiting book bans in New Jersey. In his last year as governor, he granted 455 pardons and commutations.

=== New York congestion pricing ===
On July 21, 2023, Murphy sued the U.S. Department of Transportation and the Federal Highway Administration over New York's plan to implement congestion pricing in Manhattan's most congested areas. He had argued that the program, which was intended to reduce air pollution and fund for public transit, violated the National Environmental Protection Act, which requires full environmental impact reviews of projects. Environmentalists criticized Murphy for claiming to be an environmentalist while trying to stop congestion pricing from going into effect in one of the world's most polluted and congested areas.

In January 2025, Murphy urged the incoming president, Donald Trump, to help him defeat the congestion pricing plan. In February 2025, the Trump administration issued an order terminating the plan. Trump declared himself a king in the message announcing the termination, and Murphy applauded Trump's decision. New York Governor Kathy Hochul criticized Murphy, saying: "They actually cited the will of New Jersey. Since when does New Jersey get to dictate what happens in New York?" In March, Murphy stood next to Secretary of Transportation Sean Duffy while Duffy disparaged public transit in New York and criticized New York's congestion pricing plan.

=== Public opinion ===
In April 2018, a poll found that Murphy was approved by a plurality of New Jersey residents, with 44 percent approving and 28 percent disapproving of his performance as governor; another 28 percent said they had no opinion. In February 2019, a Monmouth University survey found that Murphy's approval rating had slipped to 43 percent and his disapproval rating had risen to 40 percent. For most of 2019, Murphy ranked among the 10 least popular governors in the U.S., according to U.S. News & World Report.

A September 2019 Monmouth University survey found that 41 percent of New Jersey residents approved of Murphy and 38 percent disapproved. Another survey showed that 31 percent felt that Murphy's policies had hurt the middle class in the state, while only 17 percent said they had benefited.

During the COVID-19 pandemic, Murphy's approval rating saw a sizable uptick; a July 2020 Fairleigh Dickinson University poll found that Murphy's approval rating had increased to 67 percent, and it remained above 60 percent for the rest of the year. By mid-2023, polling indicated that opinion of Murphy's governorship had become considerably more divided, with Rutgers-Eagleton and Monmouth University surveys finding that his approval ratings had fallen to 47 and 50 percent respectively.

In 2025, polling by Emerson College found that Murphy's approval rating had fallen to 40% in May and 35% in September.

== Personal life ==
Murphy first met his future wife, Tammy Snyder, in 1987 when they both worked at Goldman Sachs, but Murphy did not ask her out for another six years. When he finally did, things progressed quickly: they became engaged 18 days later and were married within six months, in 1993. After U.S. Senator Bob Menendez resigned on August 20, 2024, Tammy unsuccessfully sought to replace him. Murphy is Catholic.

Murphy and his wife have four children. Murphy moved to Middletown Township, New Jersey, in the late 1990s. He and his family live in a riverside estate with a six-figure annual property tax bill. Murphy also owns homes in Germany and Italy. The Murphys' children have been educated at Rumson Country Day School and Phillips Academy. Tammy Snyder Murphy has held a variety of financial, civic, and political positions as well as having been a homemaker.

Murphy and his wife are part owners of Gotham FC (formerly Sky Blue FC and NJ/NY Gotham), a professional women's soccer team. In 2018, media outlets reported that the team was "plagued by poor housing, subpar facilities, and mismanagement".

On March 4, 2020, Murphy underwent surgery in New York City to remove cancerous tumors in his kidneys. He made a full recovery shortly afterward.

In 2015, Murphy received an honorary degree from Hamilton College. In 2019, he received an honorary degree from Rutgers University. In 2022, he was given the Knight Commander's Cross of the Order of Merit of the Federal Republic of Germany

=== Wealth ===
Murphy's position at Goldman Sachs when the firm had its IPO brought his net worth above $50 million. By one estimate, reported in Der Spiegel in 2009, his wealth after leaving the firm was in the range of several hundred million dollars.

In 2016, Murphy released five years' worth of federal tax returns. In 2014, he earned about $6 million, paid about $2 million in taxes for an effective tax rate of 34%, and directly or indirectly donated 24% of his income to charity. The returns for the other years showed effective tax rates ranging between 32% and 39%. Murphy's charitable donations during these five years averaged about $980,000 a year. Due to his wealth and the complicated nature of his holdings, his federal tax filings have been known to exceed 300 pages in length.

=== Civic activities ===
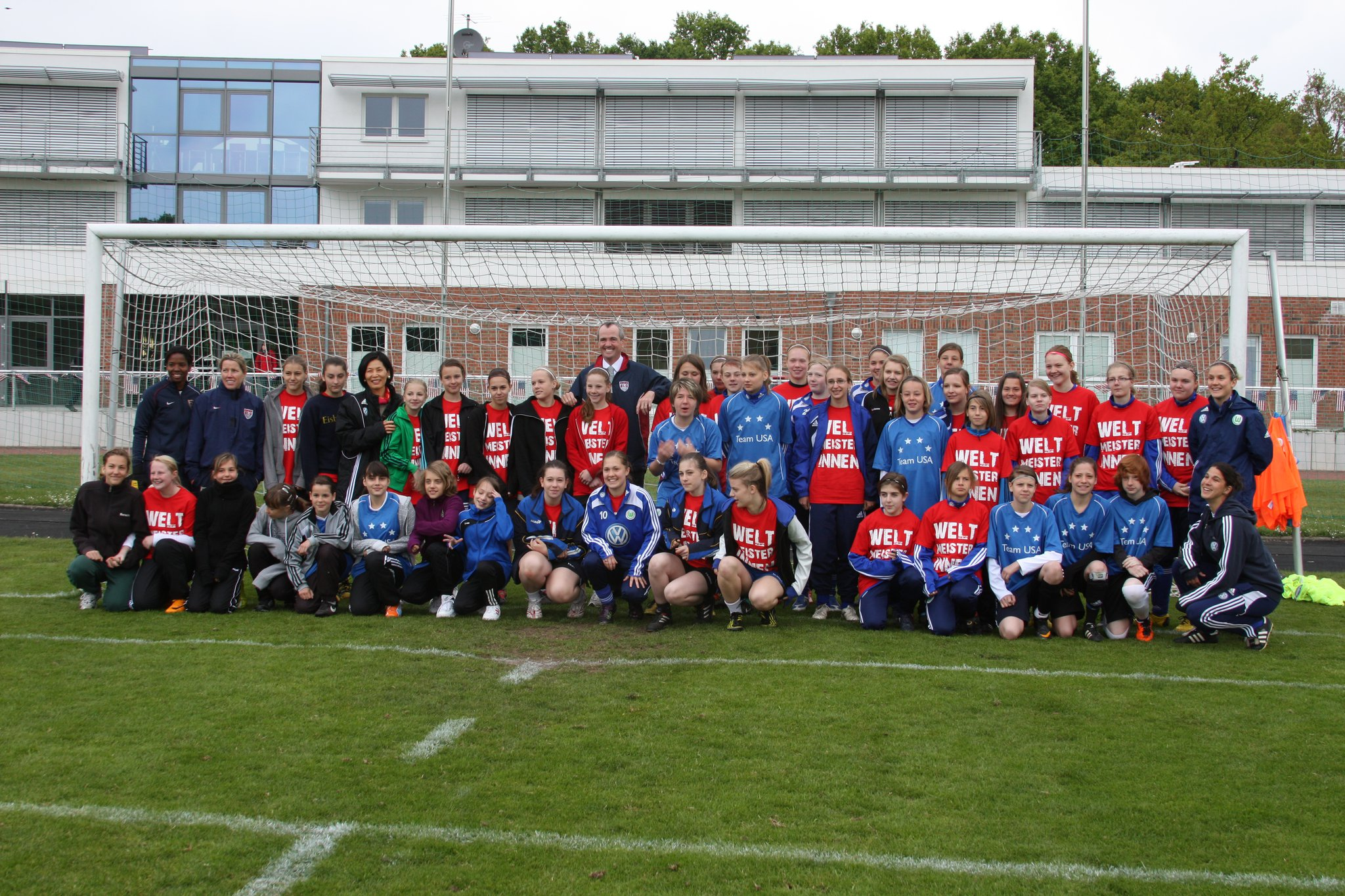
A soccer enthusiast, Ambassador Murphy poses with girls school teams in Lower Saxony in 2011. Former U.S. national team players Briana Scurry and Amanda Cromwell are also present.

Murphy has been appointed to the boards or committees of various civic or philanthropic groups, including the NAACP, the Local Initiatives Support Corporation, the Center for American Progress, 180 Turning Lives Around, and several programs of the University of Pennsylvania, such as the Huntsman Program in International Studies and Business and the Wharton School Graduate Executive and Asian Program. Other such entities include the Goldman Sachs Foundation, the Investment Company Institute, and Prosperity New Jersey. He has been the grand marshal of the St. Patrick's Day Parade in Rumson, New Jersey, several times.

Murphy has helped lead local charities to support troubled teens and domestic abuse survivors. He and his wife founded 2nd Floor, a teen helpline in New Jersey that had fielded 700,000 calls by 2015 and has helped save lives.

In 2004–2005 Murphy co-chaired a national task force on 21st-century public education for the Center for American Progress that featured fellow co-chairs Governor of Arizona Janet Napolitano and academic and civil rights figure Roger Wilkins. The Renewing Our Schools, Securing Our Future task force issued a report called "Getting Smarter, Becoming Fairer: A Progressive Education Agenda For A Stronger Nation" that called for a longer school day, a reorganized school year, and extending learning scenarios to the pre-kindergarten and post-high school domains.

The Murphy family's time in Germany made them all soccer enthusiasts. Murphy has served on the boards of the U.S. Soccer Foundation and the U.S. Soccer Federation World Cup Bid Committee for 2018 and 2022. With his wife, he co-owns a stake in the professional New Jersey women's soccer club Gotham FC; he has said that he knows the club is a money-losing venture but that he wants to show his soccer-playing daughter that women's professional soccer can exist in the United States. The club currently brings in $9.3 million yearly and is worth over $110 million.

== Electoral history ==
Democratic primary results
Party	Candidate	Votes	%
Democratic	Phil Murphy	243,643	48.37
Democratic	Jim Johnson	110,250	21.89
Democratic	John S. Wisniewski	108,532	21.55
Democratic	Raymond J. Lesniak	24,318	4.83
Democratic	William Brennan	11,263	2.24
Democratic	Mark Zinna	5,213	1.03
Democratic	Write-In	463	0.09
Total votes		503,682	100

New Jersey gubernatorial election, 2017
Party	Candidate	Votes	%	±%
Democratic	Phil Murphy	1,203,110	56.03	+17.84%
Republican	Kim Guadagno	899,583	41.89	–18.41%
Reduce Property Taxes	Gina Genovese	12,294	0.57	N/A
Libertarian	Peter J. Rohrman	10,531	0.49	–0.08%
Green	Seth Kaper-Dale	10,053	0.47	+0.08%
Constitution	Matthew Riccardi	6,864	0.32	N/A
We The People	Vincent Ross	4,980	0.23	N/A
Total votes		2,147,415	100.00	
Democratic gain from Republican		Swing	+17.8	

New Jersey gubernatorial election, 2021
Party	Candidate	Votes	%	±%
Democratic	Phil Murphy (incumbent)	1,339,471	51.22	−4.81%
Republican	Jack Ciattarelli	1,255,185	48.00	+6.11%
Green	Madelyn R. Hoffman	8,450	0.32	−0.15%
Libertarian	Gregg Mele	7,768	0.30	−0.19%
Socialist Workers	Joanne Kuniansky	4,012	0.15	N/A
Total votes		2,614,886	100.00	N/A
Democratic hold		Swing	-5.78	

Diplomatic posts
Preceded by William R. Timken	United States Ambassador to Germany; 2009–2013	Succeeded by John B. Emerson
Party political offices
Preceded by Barbara Buono	Democratic nominee for Governor of New Jersey; 2017, 2021	Succeeded by Mikie Sherrill
Preceded by Gina Raimondo	Chair of the Democratic Governors Association; 2019–2020	Succeeded by Michelle Lujan Grisham
Preceded by Roy Cooper	Chair of the Democratic Governors Association; 2022–2023	Succeeded by Tim Walz
Political offices
Preceded by Chris Christie	Governor of New Jersey; 2018–2026	Succeeded by Mikie Sherrill
Preceded by Asa Hutchinson	Chair of the National Governors Association; 2022–2023	Succeeded by Spencer Cox
U.S. order of precedence (ceremonial)
Preceded by Chris Christie as Former Governor	Order of precedence of the United States; Within New Jersey	Succeeded by Jack Markell as Former Governor
Preceded by Chris Christie as Former Governor	Order of precedence of the United States; Outside New Jersey	Succeeded by Joe Frank Harris as Former Governor
