= William R. Timken =

American industrialist, businessman and former diplomat

William Robert Timken Jr.
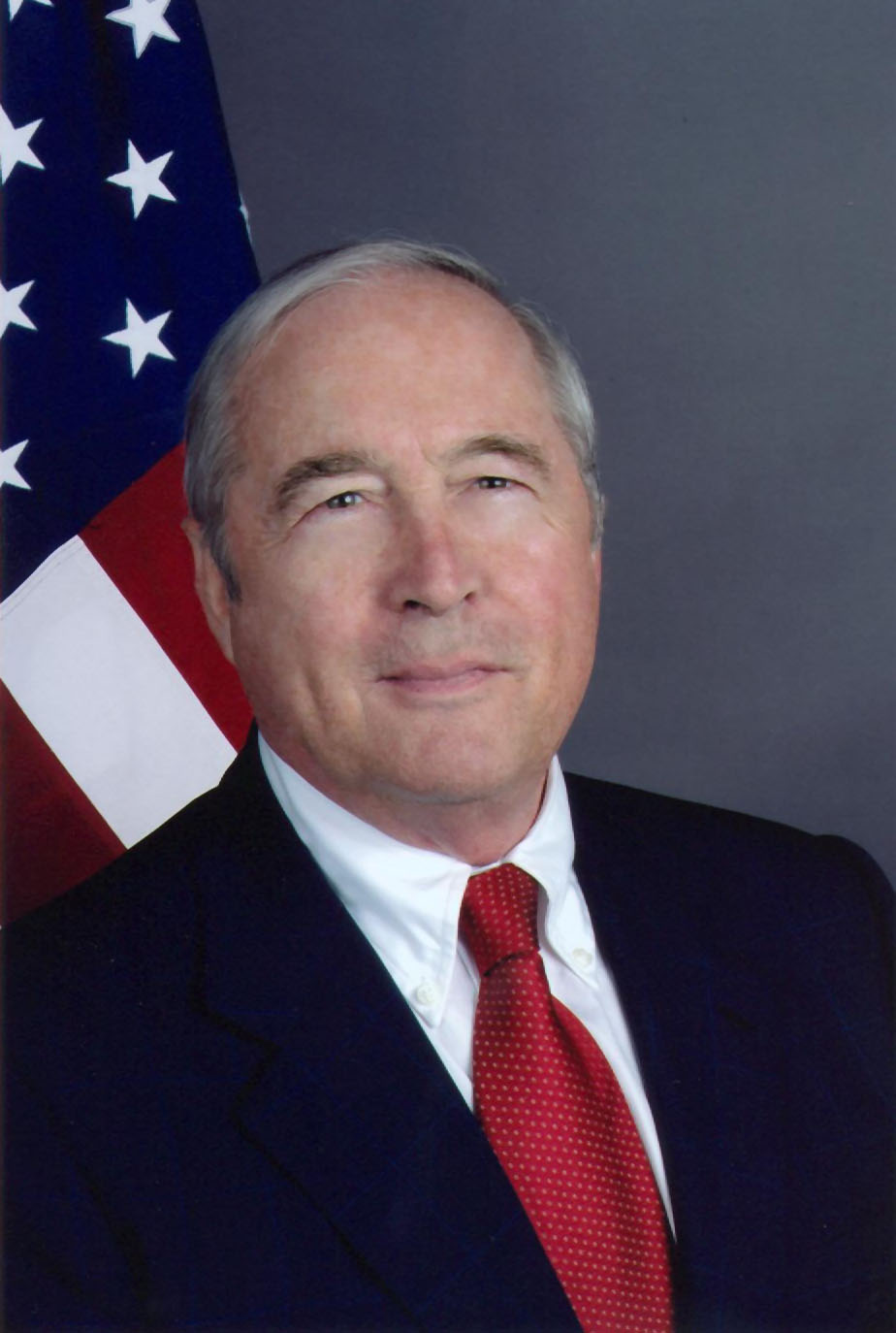

United States Ambassador to Germany
- In office September 2, 2005 – December 5, 2008
- President: George W. Bush
- Preceded by: Dan Coats
- Succeeded by: Phil Murphy

Personal details
- Born: December 21, 1938 (age 87) Canton, Ohio, U.S.
- Children: 6
- Education: Phillips Academy, Stanford University, Harvard Business School

William Robert Timken Jr. (born December 21, 1938) is an American industrialist, businessman and former diplomat. He served as the U.S. Ambassador to Germany from 2005–2008. He has served at The Timken Company (which his great-grandfather Henry Timken founded) as chairman of the board of directors, president and CEO. Timken has been chairman of Securities Investor Protection Corporation, National Association of Manufacturers, The Manufacturing Institute and the Ohio Business Roundtable. He also served on the advisory council of the Stanford University School of Business and the U.S.-Japan Business Council.

Timken is an honorary citizen of Colmar, France. He attended Phillips Academy and received his bachelor's degree from Stanford University, where he was captain of the swim team. He earned his MBA from Harvard Business School. He is married with 6 children. He was recipient of the Gold Medallion Award from the International Swimming Hall of Fame in 2009.

He is of German descent and was honored by the German-American Heritage Foundation of the USA in 2009. His great-grandfather was from Tarmstedt, Germany, near the city of Bremen.

== See also ==
- Distinguished German-American of the Year

Diplomatic posts
Preceded by Dan Coats	United States Ambassador to Germany; September 2, 2005–December 5, 2008	Succeeded by Phil Murphy
