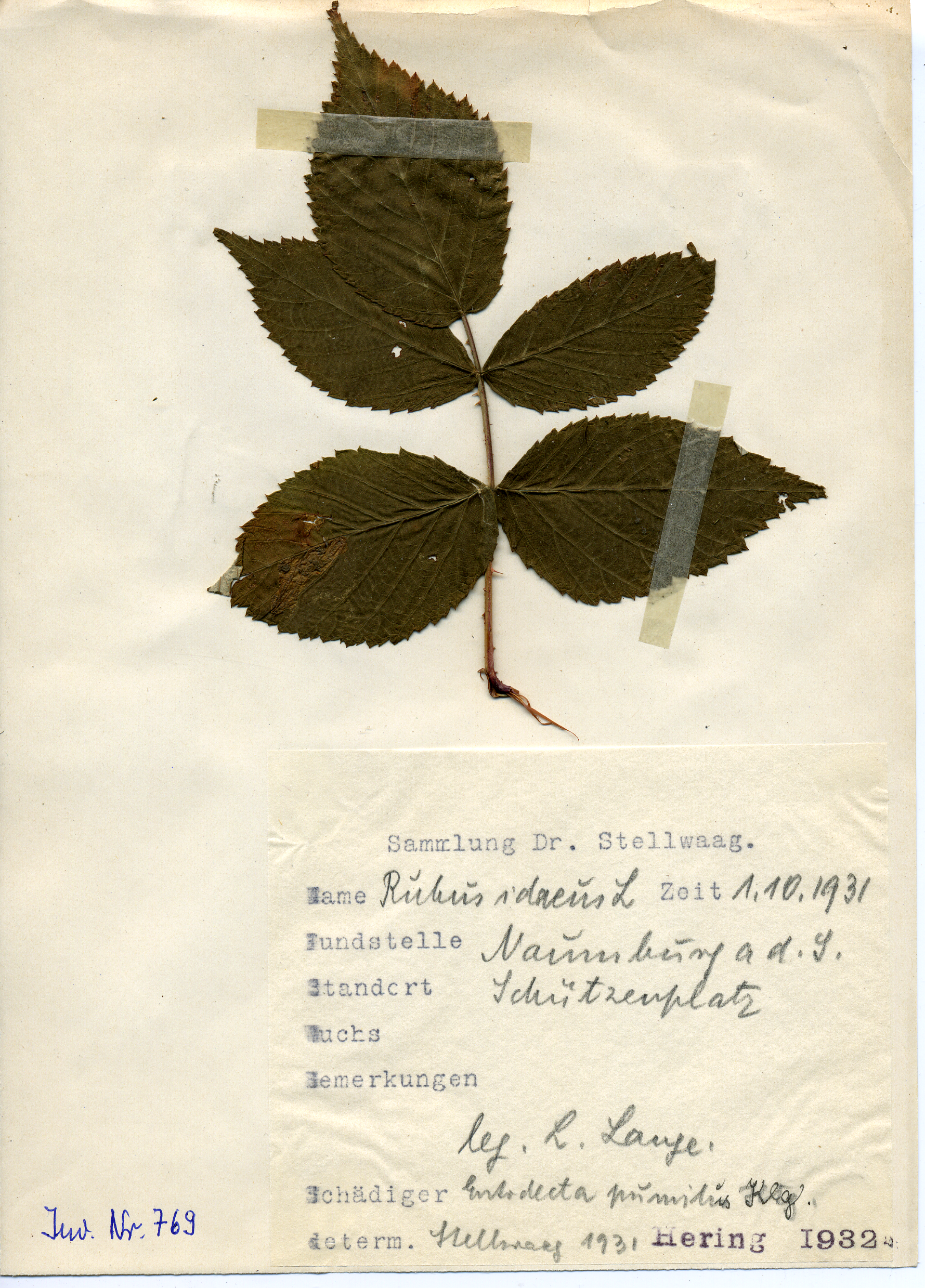
- Metallus pumilus leafmine Museum Weisbaden

Scientific classification
- Domain: Eukaryota
- Kingdom: Animalia
- Phylum: Arthropoda
- Class: Insecta
- Order: Hymenoptera
- Suborder: Symphyta
- Family: Tenthredinidae
- Genus: Metallus
- Species: M. pumilus

Binomial name
- Metallus pumilus (Klug, 1816)

= Metallus pumilus =

Species of sawfly

Metallus pumilus is a Palearctic species of sawfly.
