= Timken Roller Bearing Company =

Rail technology company

The Timken Roller Bearing Company was one of the first to introduce roller bearings for railroad cars. Railroad cars owned and operated by the Atchison, Topeka and Santa Fe Railway were some of the first to use roller bearings rather than "oil waste journal" boxes. Henry Timken, a German immigrant, invented an improved bearing and founded the company in 1899. It was later renamed The Timken Company.

== Passenger cars ==
The Santa Fe was the first company to have roller bearing trucks made by Timken under their passenger cars, much to the delight of their passengers, and the bottom line for the company. Timken commissioned the construction of a demonstration boxcar in 1943 that was first displayed at the 1948 Chicago Rail Fair. It was a rolling advertisement for a new way of reducing friction – roller bearings (made by the Timken Roller Bearing Company). The car's trucks lacked the then common axle journal boxes, with the bearings mounted on the ends of the axles outside the wheels.

== Locomotives ==
=== United States ===
The first locomotive to use roller bearings made by Timken was Timken 1111, a 4-8-4 built by Alco in 1930. The locomotive was used on 15 American railroads for demonstration runs, and was purchased by the Northern Pacific Railroad, the last railroad to try the specially-built locomotive, in 1933. It operated in regular service on the NP until retirement in 1957 and was subsequently scrapped.

=== United Kingdom ===
Some British steam locomotives also used roller bearings. The LMS Turbomotive was fitted with Timken roller bearings, and they were also retrofitted to some of the LMS Coronation class.

== See also ==
- SKF
- Timken Company
