= Henry Timken =

American inventor and businessman best known for his roller bearings

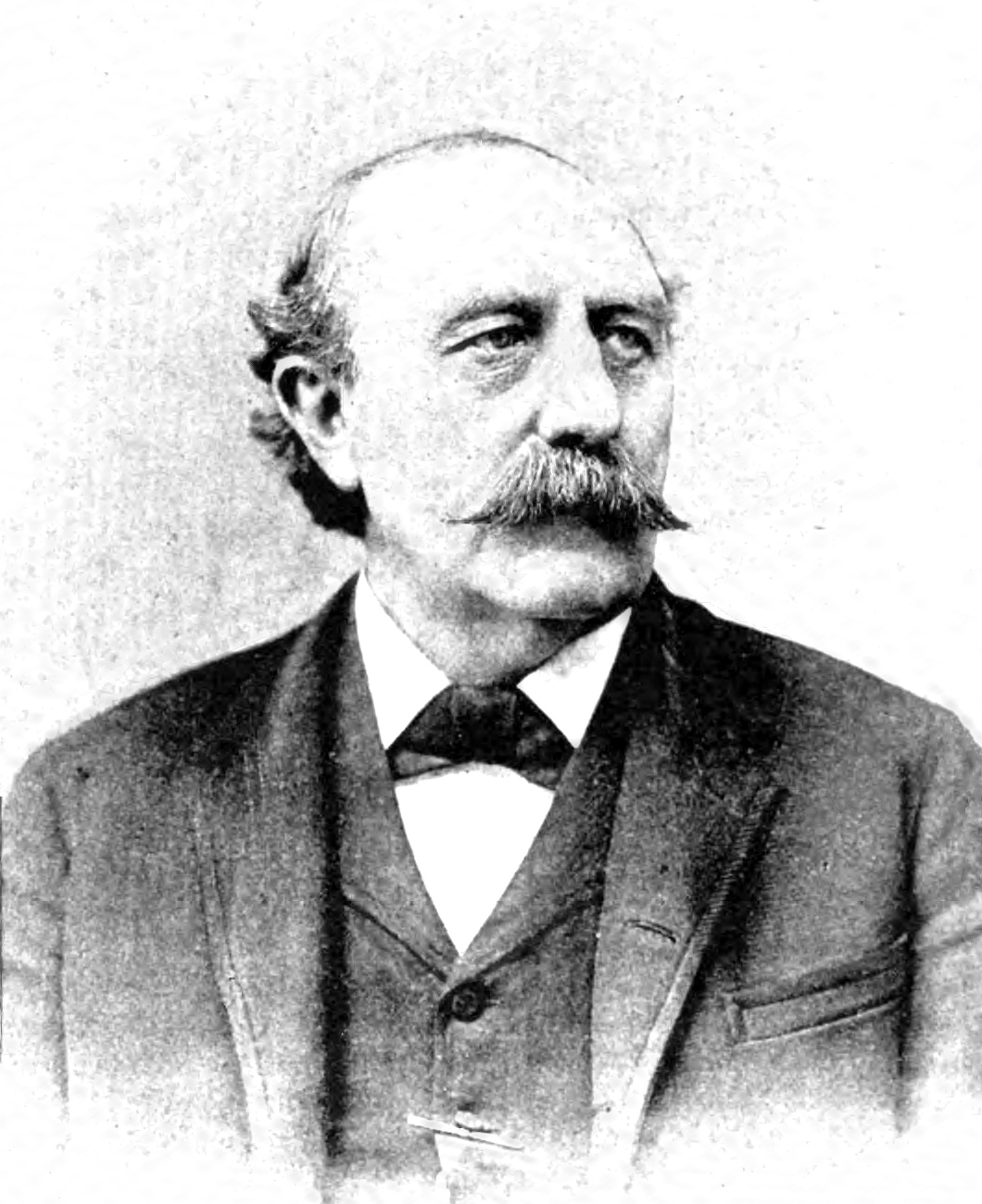
- Born: Heinrich Timken; August 16, 1831; Bremen, Germany
- Died: March 16, 1909 (aged 77); San Diego, California
- Resting place: Greenwood Memorial Park (San Diego)
- Occupation: industrialist
- Relatives: William R. Timken (great-grandson)

Henry Timken (August 16, 1831 in Bremen, Germany – March 16, 1909 in San Diego, California) was an inventor and businessman who founded the Timken Roller Bearing Company, later called the Timken Company. His family migrated to the United States when he was 7 years old. He began his business career in the St. Louis region. His inventions of an improved carriage spring and an improved roller bearing brought him the money needed to create a company dedicated to the latter.

== Biography ==
Henry Timken was born in Bremen, now in Germany, and emigrated to the United States with his family when he was seven years old. The Timkens settled in Sedalia, Missouri; Henry left the family farm to apprentice under carriage-builder Caspar Schurmeier. Timken opened his own carriage-building company in St. Louis in 1855, and introduced several improvements to the carriages his firm produced, including his patented "Timken buggy spring", which made him a fortune.

He patented an improved tapered roller bearing in 1898. A year later, he established the Timken Roller Bearing Axle Company which grew rapidly as the product was in great demand by cars, trucks, and tractors. By 1923, 90% of the country's production of bearings came from Timken. His slogan "Wherever wheels and shafts turn", describes the widespread use for bearings—trains, conveyors, elevators, aircraft engines, even space shuttle landing wheels.

He first retired in 1887 and settled in San Diego, California, but regretted retiring in 1891 and went back to St Louis. He later returned to San Diego for a second retirement before dying there in 1909. His last residence still stands, and is known as Timken House. The nearby Timken Museum of Art in Balboa Park bears his family's name, as it was established with his fortune.

== Honors ==
Timken was inducted into the National Inventors Hall of Fame on September 19, 1998. Henry Timken was one of six inducted into the hall of fame at ceremonies held at the E J Thomas Hall in Akron, Ohio. William Robert Timken Jr., Timken's great-grandson, the retired chairman and chief executive officer of The Timken Company and later United States Ambassador to Germany, received the award on behalf of his great-grandfather.
