= Metallus (sawfly) =

Scientific classification
- Kingdom: Animalia
- Phylum: Arthropoda
- Clade: Pancrustacea
- Class: Insecta
- Order: Hymenoptera
- Suborder: Symphyta
- Family: Tenthredinidae
- Genus: Metallus; Forbes, 1885

Species
- See text

Synonyms
- Entodecta Konow, 1886; Polybates MacGillivray, 1909

Genus of sawflies

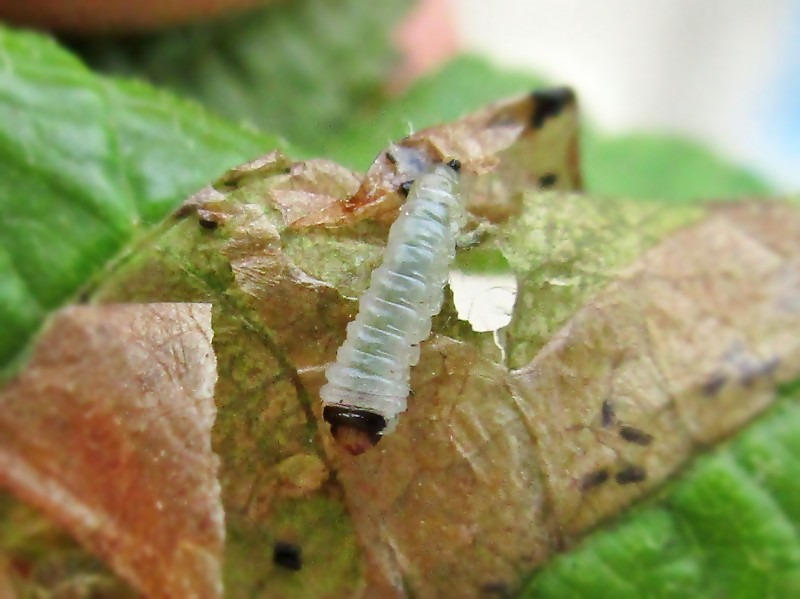
Metallus pumilus larva, Arnhem, the Netherlands

Metallus is a genus of sawflies belonging to the family Tenthredinidae. The species of this genus are found in Europe and North America.

== Species ==
The genus includes the following species:

- Metallus albipes (Cameron, 1875)
- Metallus capitalis
- Metallus lanceolatus (Thomson, 1870)
- Metallus pumilus (Klug, 1816)
- Metallus rohweri
