= Timken 1111 =

American 4-8-4 steam locomotive

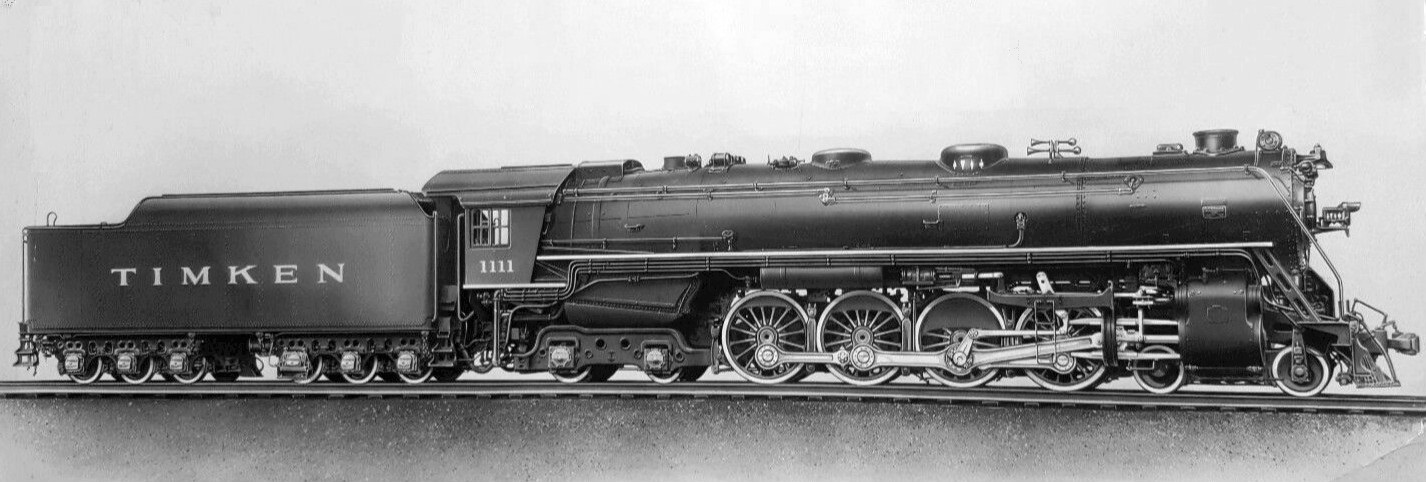
- Timken 1111 as built
Type and origin
- Power type: Steam
- Builder: American Locomotive Company (ALCO)
- Serial number: 68056
- Build date: 1930
Specifications
- Configuration
  - Whyte: 4-8-4
  - UIC: 2′D2′ h2
- Gauge: 4 ft 8 1/2 in (1,435 mm) standard gauge
- Driver dia.: 73 in (1,854 mm)
- Loco weight: Working: 417,500 lb (208.8 ST; 186.4 LT; 189.4 t); Empty: 371,100 lb (185.6 ST; 165.7 LT; 168.3 t)
- Tender weight: Working: 301,000 lb (151 ST; 134 LT; 137 t); Empty: 140,700 lb (70.4 ST; 62.8 LT; 63.8 t)
- Tender type: Class 55E
- Fuel type: Coal
- Fuel capacity: 21 short tons (18.8 long tons; 19.1 t)
- Water cap.: 14,550 US gal (55,100 L; 12,120 imp gal)
- Firebox
  - Grate area: 88.3 sq ft (8.20 m^{2})
- Boiler pressure: 250 lbf/in^{2} (1.72 MPa)
- Superheater: Type E
- Cylinders: Two, outside
- Cylinder size: 27 in × 30 in (686 mm × 762 mm)
Performance figures
- Tractive effort: Loco: 63,700 lbf (283.35 kN); Booster: 12,800 lbf (56.94 kN)
- Factor of adh.: 4.15
Career
- Operators: Timken Roller Bearing Company Northern Pacific Railroad
- Class: A-1
- Number in class: 1
- Numbers: 2626
- Nicknames: Four Aces
- Locale: regular service in Washington, Idaho and Montana
- Delivered: February 8, 1933
- Retired: August 4, 1957
- Disposition: Scrapped in 1958

Timken 1111, also named the Timken Four Aces, was a one-off 4-8-4 steam locomotive built in 1930 by American Locomotive Company (ALCO) as a demonstration unit for new roller bearings produced by the Timken Roller Bearing Company. It was the first locomotive built with all sealed roller bearings rather than plain bearings or a combination of the two. It was later operated by the Northern Pacific Railroad (NP) as their No. 2626.

Timken attempted to cooperate with NP at the end of the engine's career to preserve it and while the Northern Pacific was willing to cooperate in preserving the engine, the attempt ultimately failed, and the locomotive was scrapped in 1958.

== Design and construction ==
Timken chose a 4-8-4 on which to demonstrate the company's roller bearings so the locomotive could be used in all types of railroad work, especially on heavy freight and fast passenger trains. 52 manufacturers agreed to supply parts for the locomotive "on account" until the locomotive operated over 100,000 miles (160,000 km). The suppliers' names were placed on a plaque attached to the tender for the duration of the demonstration period.

Assembly took place at the American Locomotive Company's (ALCO) Schenectady, New York plant, the former Schenectady Locomotive Works.

== In-service demonstration ==
No. 1111's first demonstration runs were freight trains on the New York Central Railroad. It was subsequently used in both freight and passenger trains on 13 other major railroads, including the Chesapeake and Ohio Railway (C&O), the New York, New Haven and Hartford Railroad (New Haven), and the Pennsylvania Railroad (PRR), and Timken allowed the railroads to use the locomotive free of charge. The PRR used the locomotive on a passenger train where it hauled twelve passenger cars through the Allegheny Mountains so well that the train did not require the use of helpers and arrived at its destination three minutes early.

The C&O used No. 1111 to haul eight freight trains and twenty passenger trains, and in doing so, the locomotive accumulated 6,291,116 gross ton miles with minimal coal and water consumption, and on one occasion, it made up 81 minutes of delayed time while hauling the Sportsman between Detroit, Michigan and Clifton Forge, Virginia. No. 1111's performance encouraged the C&O to upgrade their passenger locomotive fleet with 4-8-4s with similar design features to those on No. 1111, and it resulted in the introduction of the C&O's "Greenbrier" fleet.

At some of the stations on No. 1111's demonstration runs, publicity stunts were held where the locomotive was pulled by as few as three men (and in Chicago, by three women). The stunts showed that the roller bearings produced so little friction that the locomotive could easily be moved by hand.

By August 1931, No. 1111 had accumulated over 90,000 miles (140,000 km) when it was delivered to the Northern Pacific Railroad (NP), the 15th railroad to demonstrate it. With a dynamometer car in tow, the Northern Pacific was able to operate the locomotive at sustained speeds as high as 88 miles per hour (142 km/h) while pulling the North Coast Limited passenger train past Willow Creek, Montana. However, while in service for the NP, No. 1111 suffered severe crown sheet damage. Timken demanded NP repair it, but the railroad refused to repair a locomotive they did not own. The resulting agreement led to the sale of No. 1111 to Northern Pacific.

== Regular use and disposition ==
The Northern Pacific purchased No. 1111 from Timken on February 8, 1933, after it crossed the 100,000-mile (160,000 km) mark. The railroad renumbered it as No. 2626, classifying it internally as an A-1 (it was the class's sole member), used it in passenger service between Seattle and Yakima, Washington, then shifted its service to passenger trains between Seattle and Missoula, Montana. They operated it for 23 years before retiring it from active service. Its final run occurred on August 4, 1957, when it pulled a passenger train from Seattle to Cle Elum and return.

NP subsequently reported that No. 2626 had accumulated around 2,100,000 miles (3,400,000 km) while in NP service and had consumed 80,000 tonnes (180,000,000 lb) of coal, 9,000,000 U.S. gallons (7,500,000 imp gal) of fuel oil, and more than 17,500,000 U.S. gallons (14,600,000 imp gal) of water. Efforts were made to preserve the locomotive; the Timken Company even tried to purchase it and return to the company's Canton, Ohio headquarters under its own power. In 1958, before Timken and Northern Pacific could complete their negotiations, the No. 2626 was scrapped in South Tacoma.
