= Timken House =

Coordinates: 32°43′53.9″N 117°9′51.2″W

The Timken House is a Queen Anne Victorian house in San Diego, California. It was designed by the prominent architects Comstock and Trotsche and built in 1888. It was the last residence of inventor Henry Timken (1831-1909). Henry Timken Jr. (grandson of inventor Henry Timken), along with the Putnam sisters, co-founded the Timken Museum of Art in Balboa Park, a short distance from the home. The Timken House became a private residence in 1965.

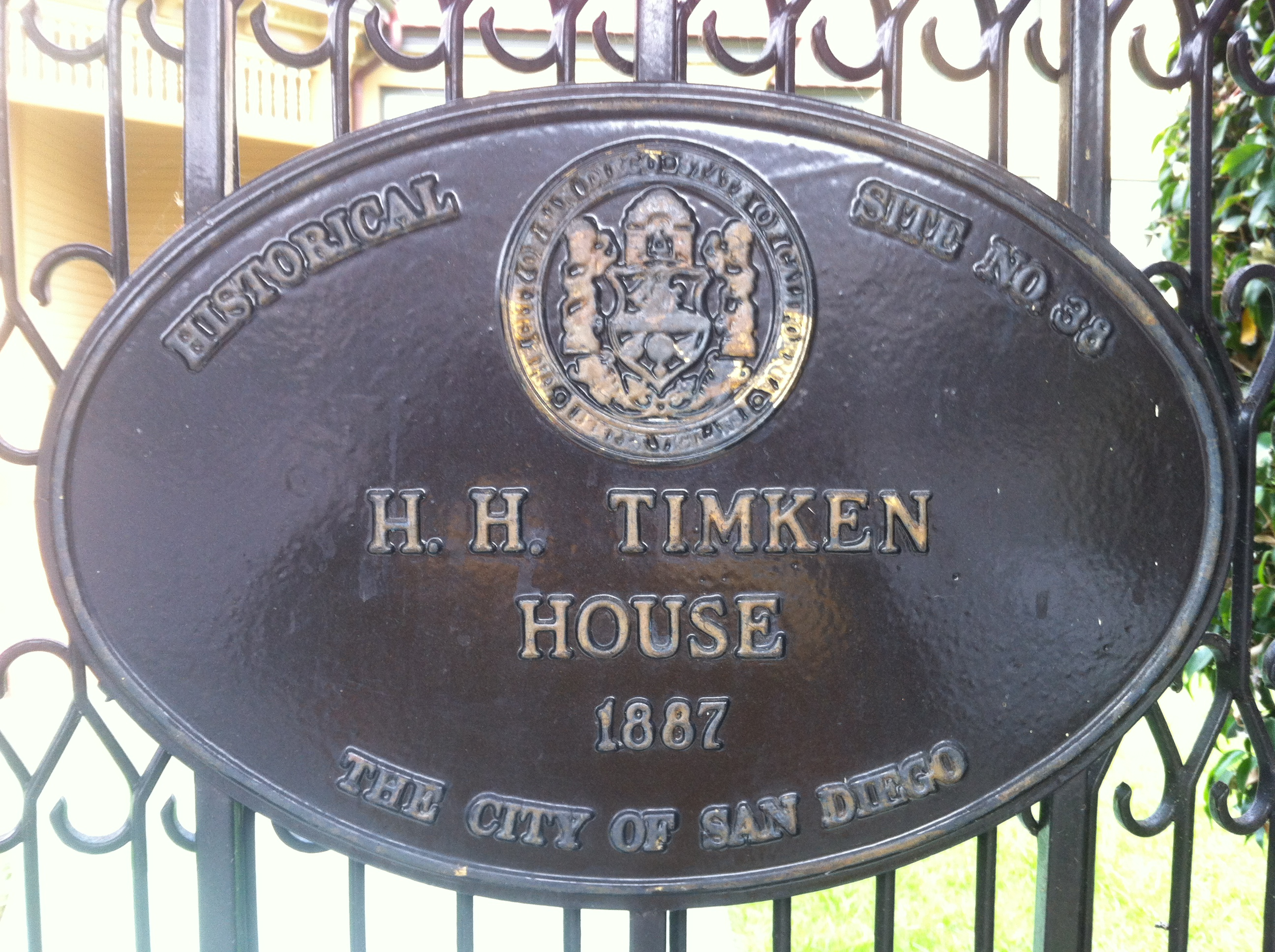
Timken House plaque

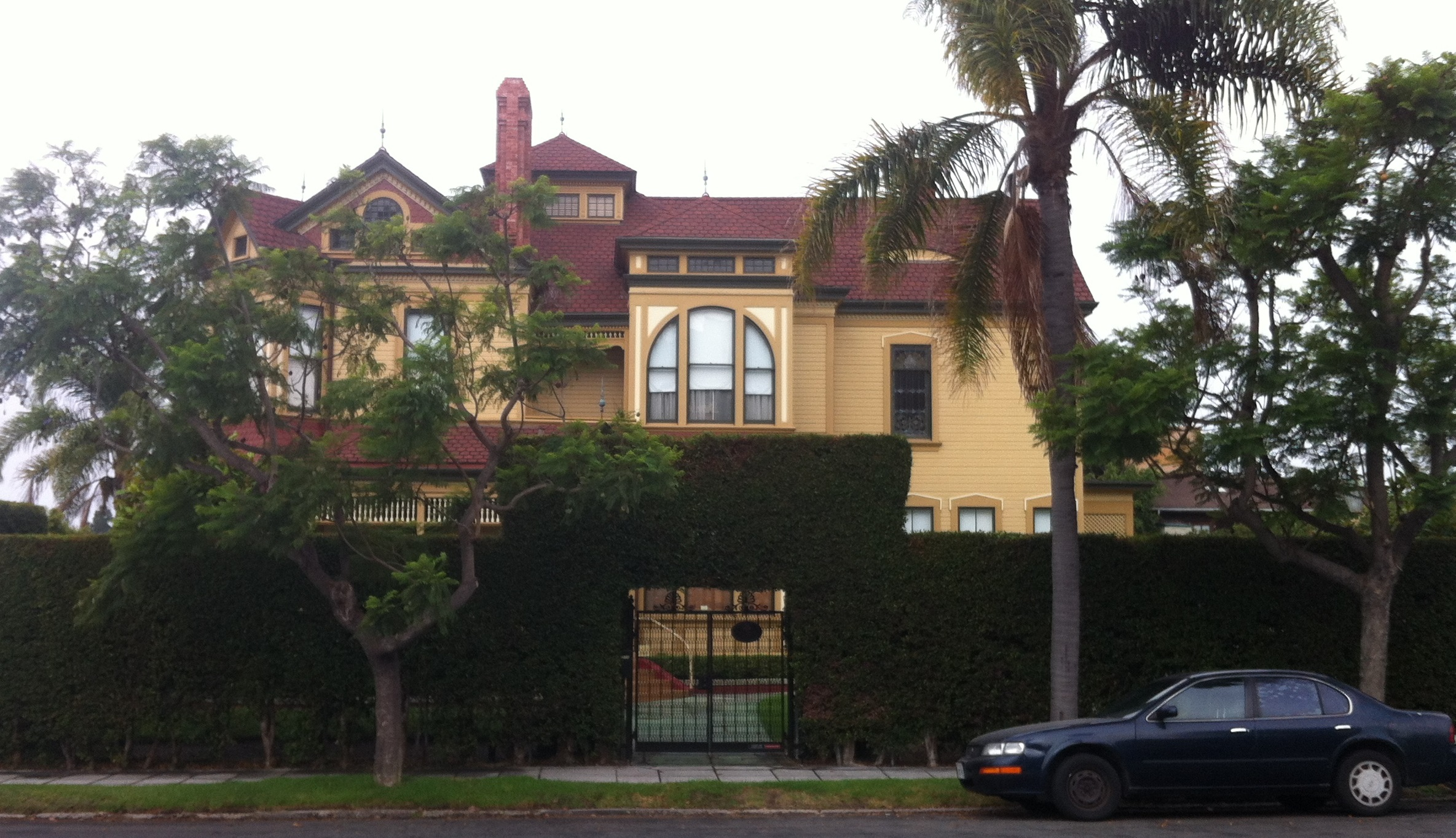
Timken Corner, across 1st Avenue

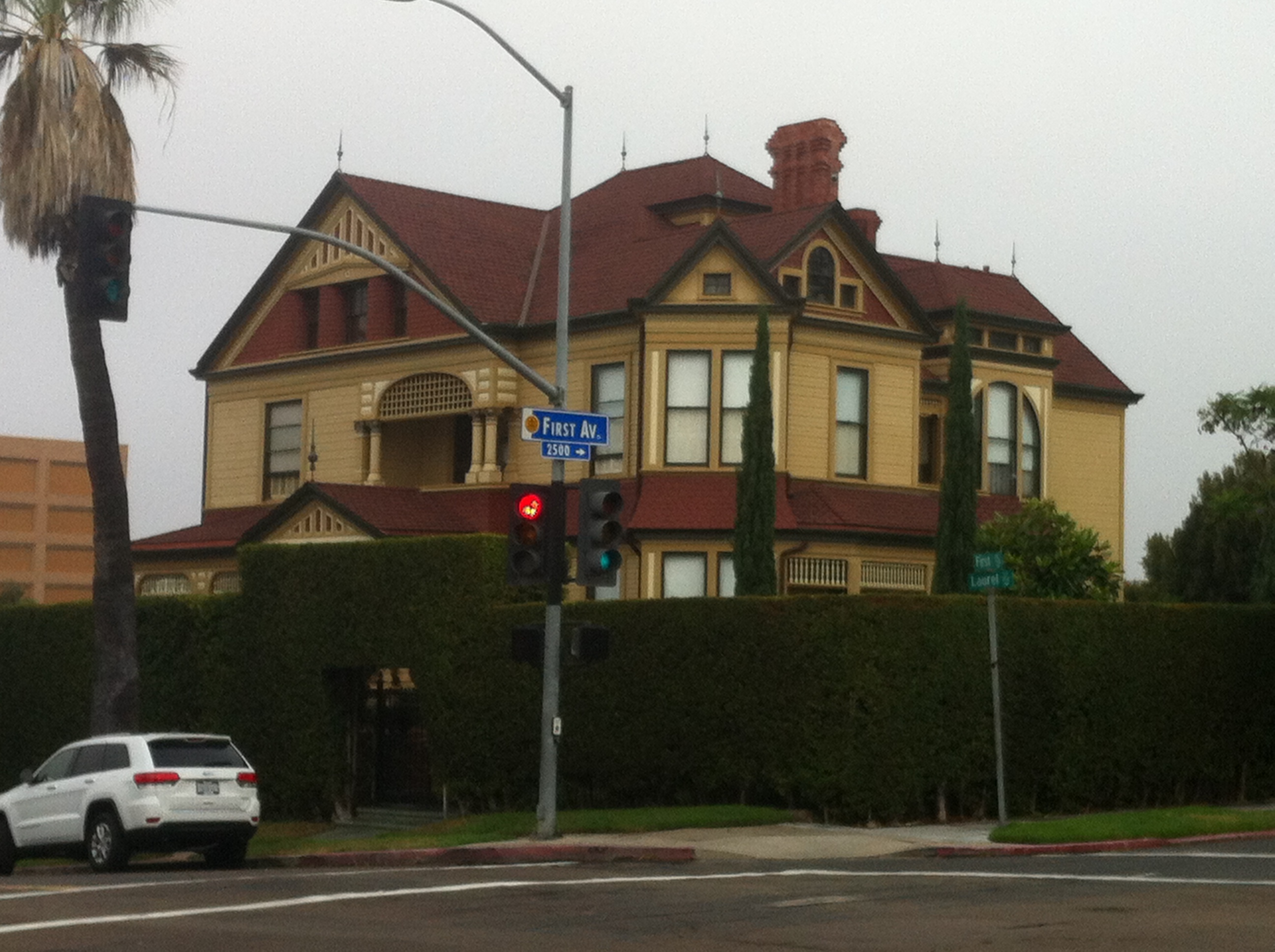
Timken House - catercorner

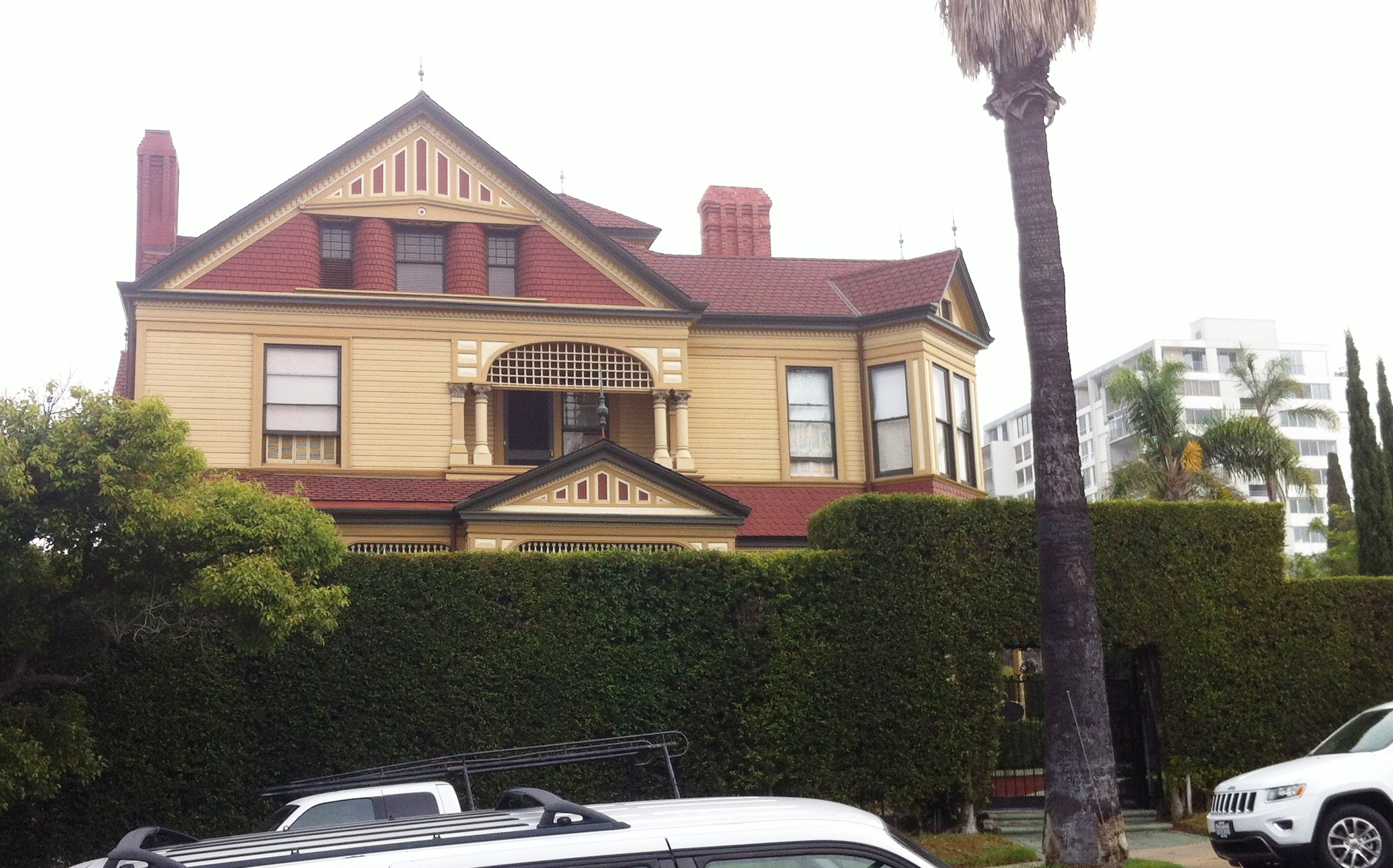
Timken Corner, across Laurel
