= Timken Company =

American industrial company

The Timken Company
- Type: Public
- Traded as: NYSE: TKR; S&P 400 Component
- Industry: Manufacturing
- Founded: 1899; 127 years ago in St. Louis, Missouri, U.S.
- Founder: Henry Timken
- Headquarters: North Canton, Ohio, U.S.
- Area served: Worldwide
- Key people: John M. Timken Jr.(Non-Executive Chairman of the Board of Directors), Lucian Boldea (President & CEO)
- Products: Bearings; Chain, Couplings, Clutches, Filtration Products, Hydraulic Components, Industrial Brakes, Linear Actuators, Seals, Universal Joints
- Services: Bearing Repair Services, Electric Motor Services, Gear Repair Services, Onsite Technical Services
- Revenue: ▼US$ $4.6 billion (FY 2024)
- Operating income: ▼US$ $611.1 million (FY 2024)
- Net income: ▼US$ $375.3 million (FY 2024)
- Total assets: ▼US$ $6.4 billion (FY 2024)
- Total equity: ▲US$ $3 billion (FY 2024)
- Number of employees: 19,000 (2024)
- Divisions: Engineered Bearings, Industrial Motion
- Website: www.timken.com

The Timken Company is a global manufacturer of engineered bearings and industrial motion products. Headquartered in North Canton, Ohio, the company operates from 45 countries.

== History ==
In 1898, Henry Timken obtained a patent for an improved tapered roller bearing, and in 1899 incorporated as The Timken Roller Bearing Axle Company in St. Louis.

In 1901, The Timken Company moved to Canton, Ohio, as the automobile industry began to overtake the carriage industry. Timken and his two sons chose this location because of its proximity to the American car manufacturing centers of Detroit and Cleveland and the American steel-making centers of Pittsburgh and Cleveland.

In 1917, the company began steel- and tube-making operations in Canton to vertically integrate and maintain better control over the steel used in its bearings. World War I had created an increase in demand for steel, affecting its supply and price in the market.

The Timken Company entered international markets in the early 1900s, establishing a presence initially in Great Britain, France and Germany. The performance of Timken tapered roller bearings in World War I military equipment made an impression on the European bearing market. After the war, Great Britain rose to the position of #2 in the global automotive manufacturing market, creating opportunities for the company to expand its European manufacturing presence.

The Timken Company entered the Great Depression in a strong financial position and its performance placed it in the ranks of the most solid, well-managed industrial firms of the 1930s. Expanding into non-automotive markets like agriculture, machine tooling, industrial and rail softened the impact.

During World War II, The Timken Company's production increased dramatically to keep up with wartime demand. For instance, every U.S. jeep was built using 24 Timken bearings. With 660,000 jeeps delivered to the U.S. military, the company delivered more than 15.8 million bearings for those vehicles over the course of the war. Following the war, much of the machinery shipped to Europe under the Marshall Plan was Timken-bearing equipped, helping The Timken Company establish a broader presence in a bearing market where European competitors had dominated.

By 1960, The Timken Company had operations in the U.S., Canada, Great Britain, France, South Africa, Australia and Brazil. Timken Research was created in 1966 to establish technological leadership and to help standardize research and development processes across the company.

The Timken Company expanded into new global markets throughout the 1970s and 1980s, establishing a sales operation in Japan in 1974 and opening sales offices in Italy, Korea, Singapore and Venezuela in 1988. By the late 1990s the company also had a sales presence in Spain, Hong Kong, China and Singapore.

The Timken Company acquired its competitor, The Torrington Company, in 2003 for $840 million, doubling the size of the company and creating the world's third-largest bearing manufacturer at that time.

The company changed its corporate structure in 2014; the roller bearing-producing part of the company was separated from the steel-producing part of the company, resulting in two separate companies. The Timken Company continues to manufacture roller bearings, while Metallus, formerly known as TimkenSteel, produces steel.

The Timken Company entered the linear motion space in 2018 with the acquisition of Rollon, a maker of linear guides, telescopic rails, and linear actuators and systems used in a wide range of industrial and commercial applications. To further expand and strengthen its position in the attractive linear motion space, the company acquired iMS in 2021 and added Nadella's complementary product portfolio in 2023.

In 2023, The Timken Company expanded its Industrial Motion segment with the acquisitions of Des-Case, Rosa Sistemi and Lagersmit. The company also bolstered its engineered bearings portfolio in 2023 with the acquisitions of American Roller Bearing and Engineered Solutions Group (iMECH). Timken acquired CGI, Inc. in 2024, expanding its motion-control platform.

In March 2026, The Timken Company acquired lubrication systems company Bijur Delimon International.

== Products ==
The Timken Company posted $4.6 billion in sales in 2024 and employs more than 19,000 people globally, operating from 45 countries.

Timken is focused on expanding its tapered roller bearings and growing its offering of industrial bearings and mechanical power transmission products and services. Today the company engineers, manufactures and markets bearings, gear drives, automated lubrication systems, chain, couplings and linear motion products, and offers a spectrum of powertrain rebuild and repair services. Timken products are used in a variety of diversified markets including railroading, food and beverage, energy harvesting, marine vessels, mining, agriculture, construction, civil aerospace, defense and commercial vehicles.

In 2023, the company's wheel bearings were used on Ford Motor Company's F-150 Lightning and Philadelphia Gear main reduction gears were installed in the latest generation of United States Navy ships.

== Timken OK Load ==
Timken OK Load is a standardised measurement that indicates the possible performance of extreme pressure (EP) additives in a lubricating grease or oil. The units of measurement are pounds-force or kilograms-force. This measurement is performed using a special test machine and standard block and ring test specimens.

The test machine is based on a machine manufactured by the Timken Company from 1935 to 1972. It is now an industry-recognized standard test to compare extreme pressure resistance of greases and oils in a reproducible way.

It is not to be confused with some smaller lubricity testers that are also often erroneously called Timken: The confusion originates from a now obsolete Italian brand TIMPKEN.

The test machine consists of a standardized bearing race mounted on a tapered arbour rotating at high speed. The race is brought into contact with a square steel test block under a constant load. The contact area is flooded with the lubricant or grease being tested. The Timken OK Load is the highest standard load at which the spinning bearing race produces no scouring mark on the test block, but only a uniform wear scar.

Timken OK Loads are listed on grease and oil property charts and are part of many specifications. It was once generally assumed that the measure and the film strength of the lubricant were directly related. Today, the primary purpose of the test is to determine whether EP additives are present and functioning. A measure of 35 pounds (16 kilograms-force or 155 newtons) or more means that EP additives are present and working well.

The Timken OK Load test methods are ASTM D-2509 for greases and ASTM D-2782 for oils.

There are a few portable versions of smaller testers utilizing similar test methods for public demonstration or for product showcase.
