= Inline skate wheel =

Inline skate wheels are made of polyurethane, a material that revolutionized various forms of skating, including skating on inline skates.

== Polyurethane ==
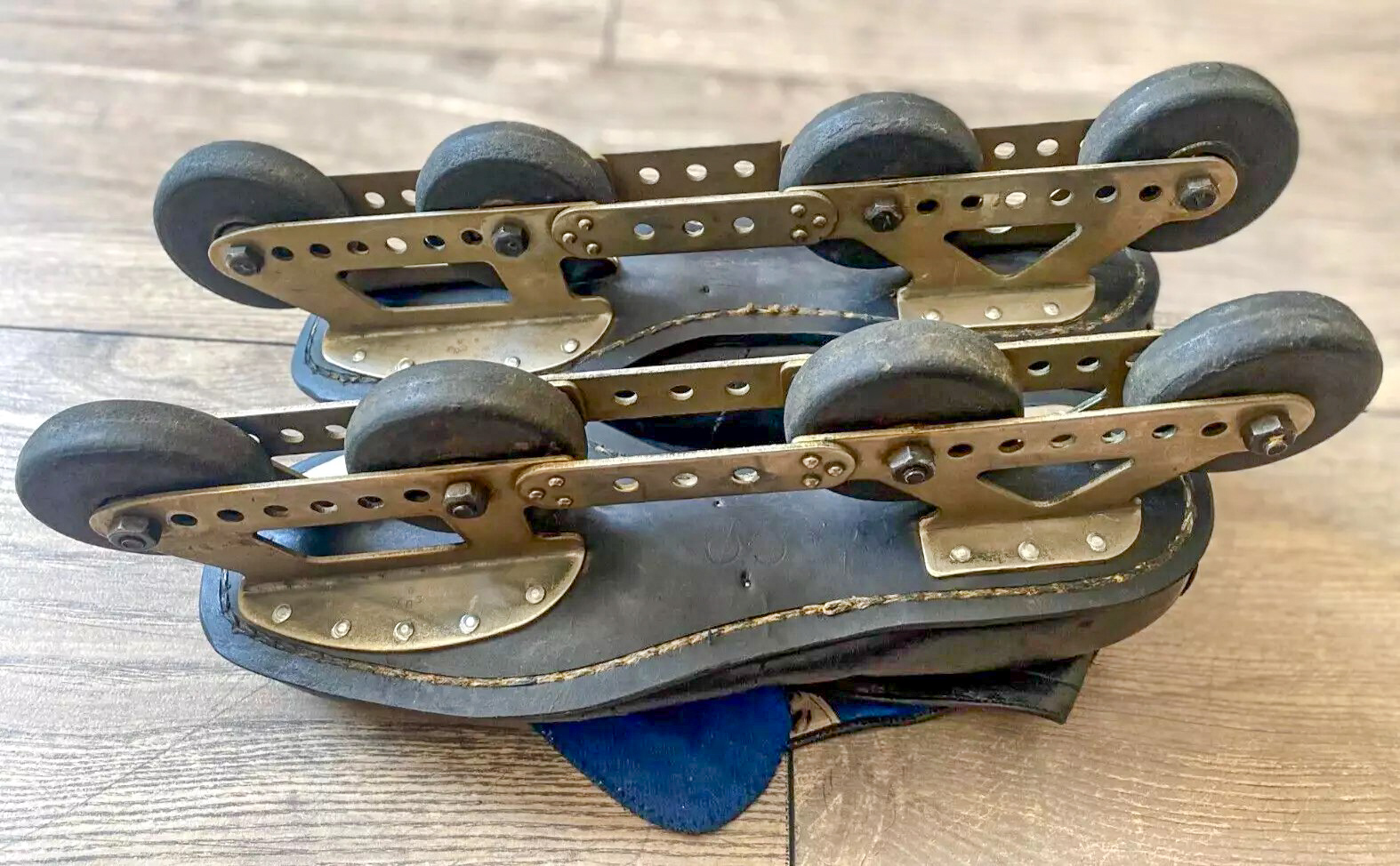
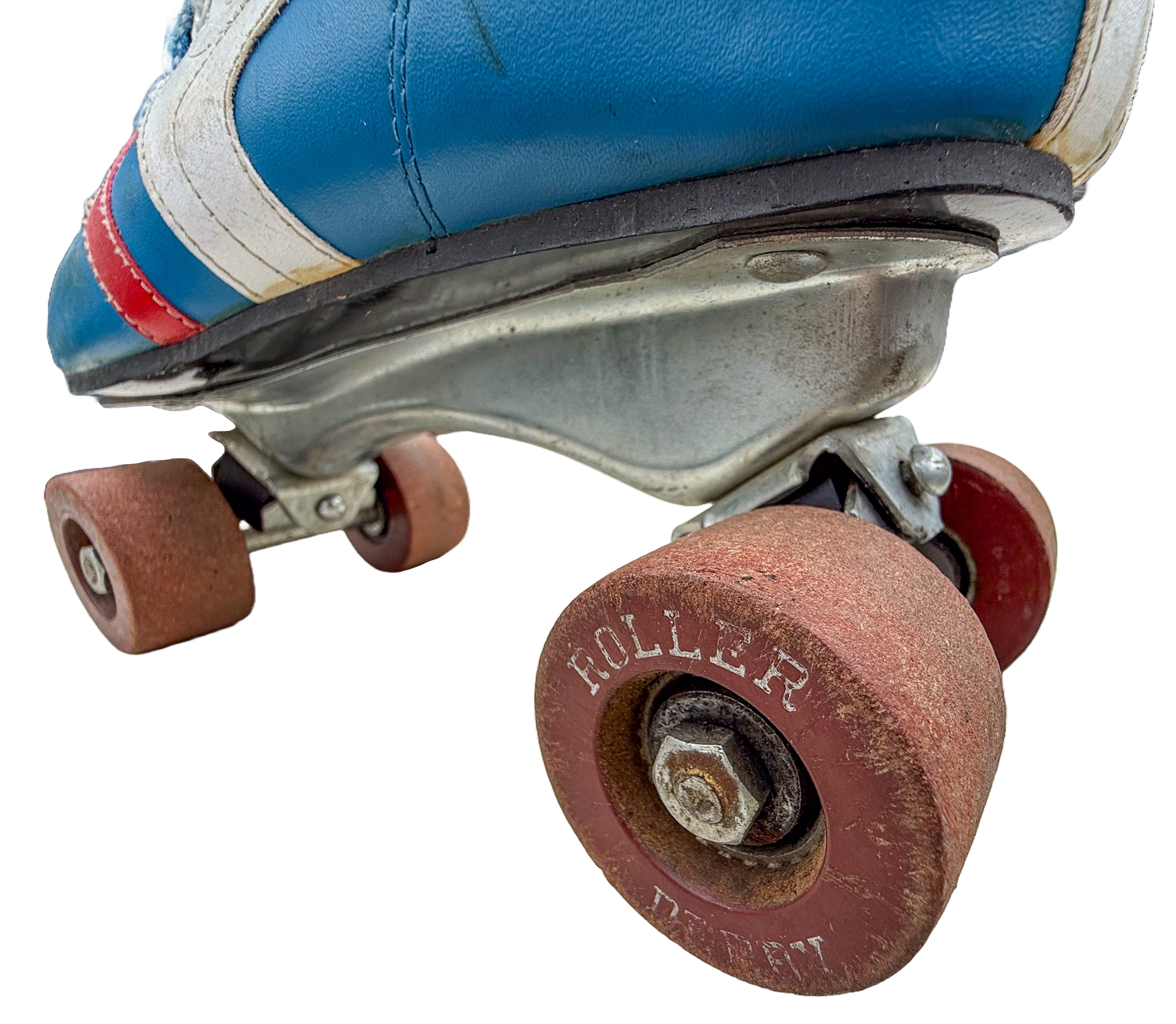
Composition wheels: inline (1962) & quad (1970s)

Modern inline wheels are made of polyurethane, a material that revolutionized skating. Before the widespread adoption polyurethane, roller skates and skateboards used composition wheels made from clay or rubber mixed with sawdust and other fibers. These composition wheels were prone to swelling from moisture and could shatter on impact, contributing to a decline in skateboarding by the late 1960s. (Note: Roller Derby made clay composition wheels in the 1960s for their "sidewalk surfboards" (skateboards). The same wheels were used in their Royal Sidewalk line of roller skates as late as 1974 (archived catalog page). By 1978, however, the same Royal Sidewalk line adopted polyurethane wheels under the brand Fireball (archived catalog page). See archived entry and images of this Etsy listing showing a pair of Royal Sidewalk skates with these clay wheels: listing page, image 1, and image 2.)

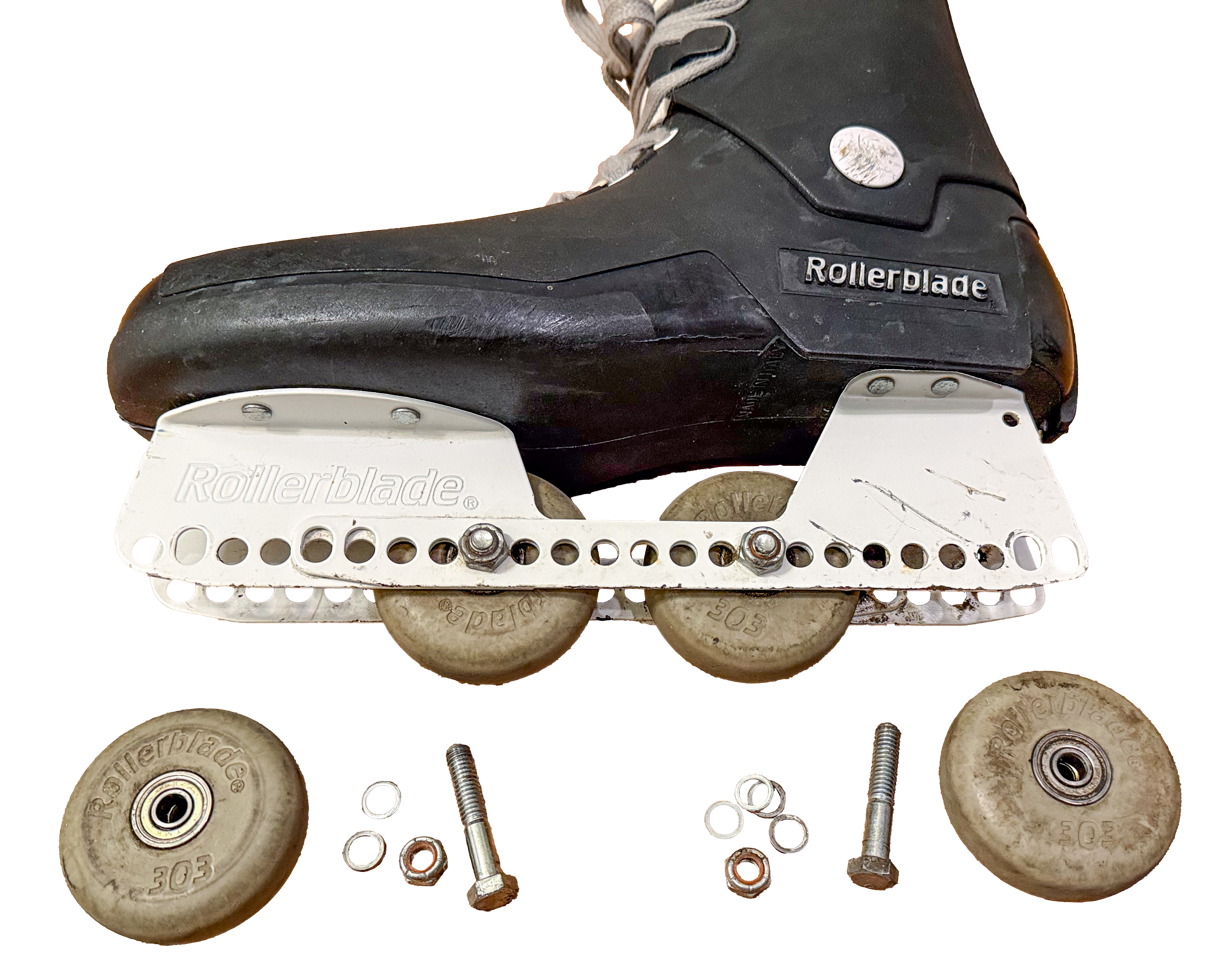
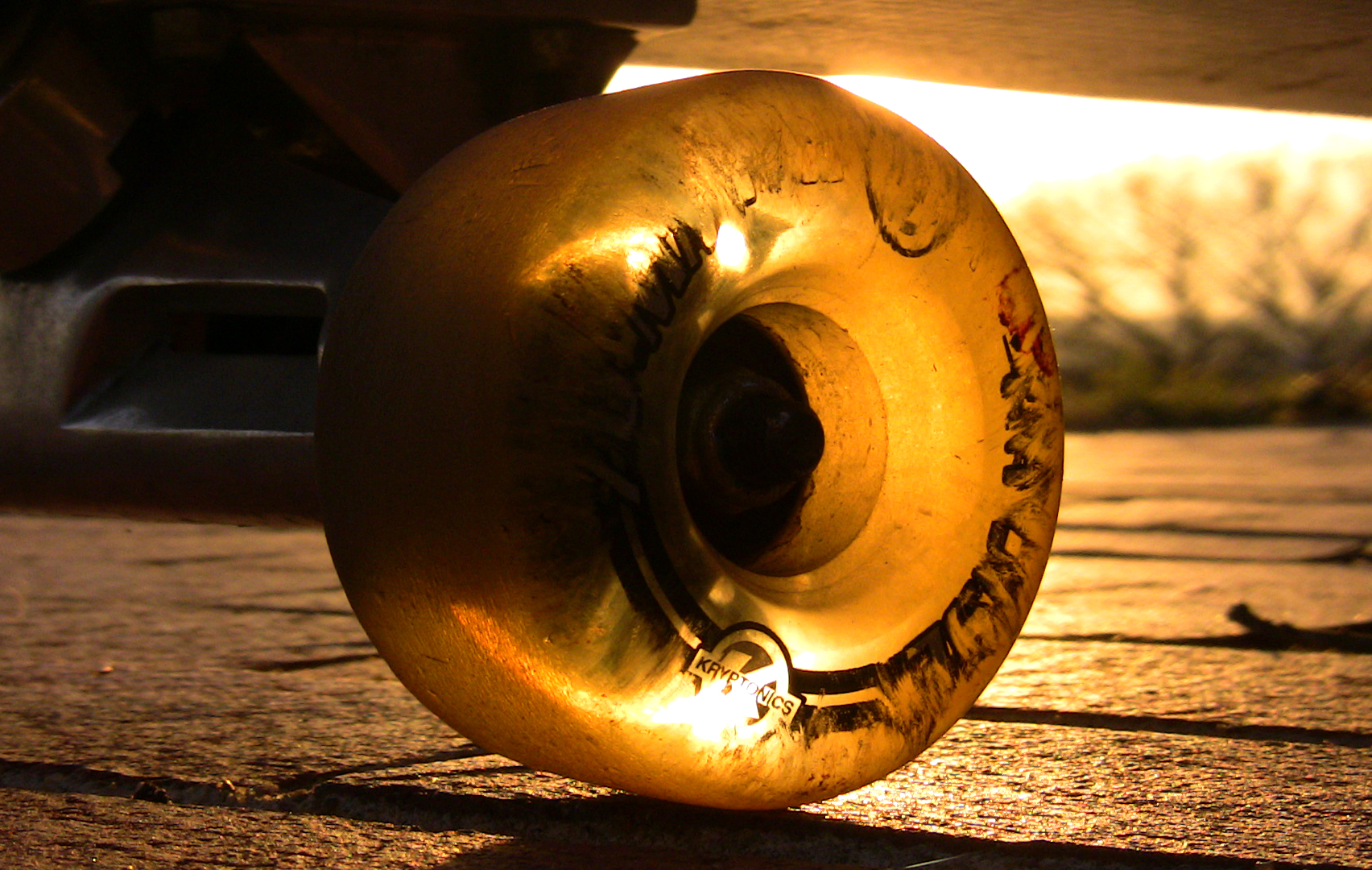
Urethane wheels: inline (1980s) & skateboard (2010)

In the early 1970s, roller skaters experimented with polyurethane wheels, but they proved too grippy, and slow for roller rinks with wooden floors, where composition wheels performed better. However, by the mid-1970s, skateboarders repurposed polyurethane wheels from roller skates, shaving them down to fit skateboards. These wheels excelled on streets, and urban terrain, offering greater durability, and impact resistance compared to their predecessors. Their elasticity provided a smoother ride over rough surfaces, helping to spark a resurgence in skateboarding after its late-1960s slump.

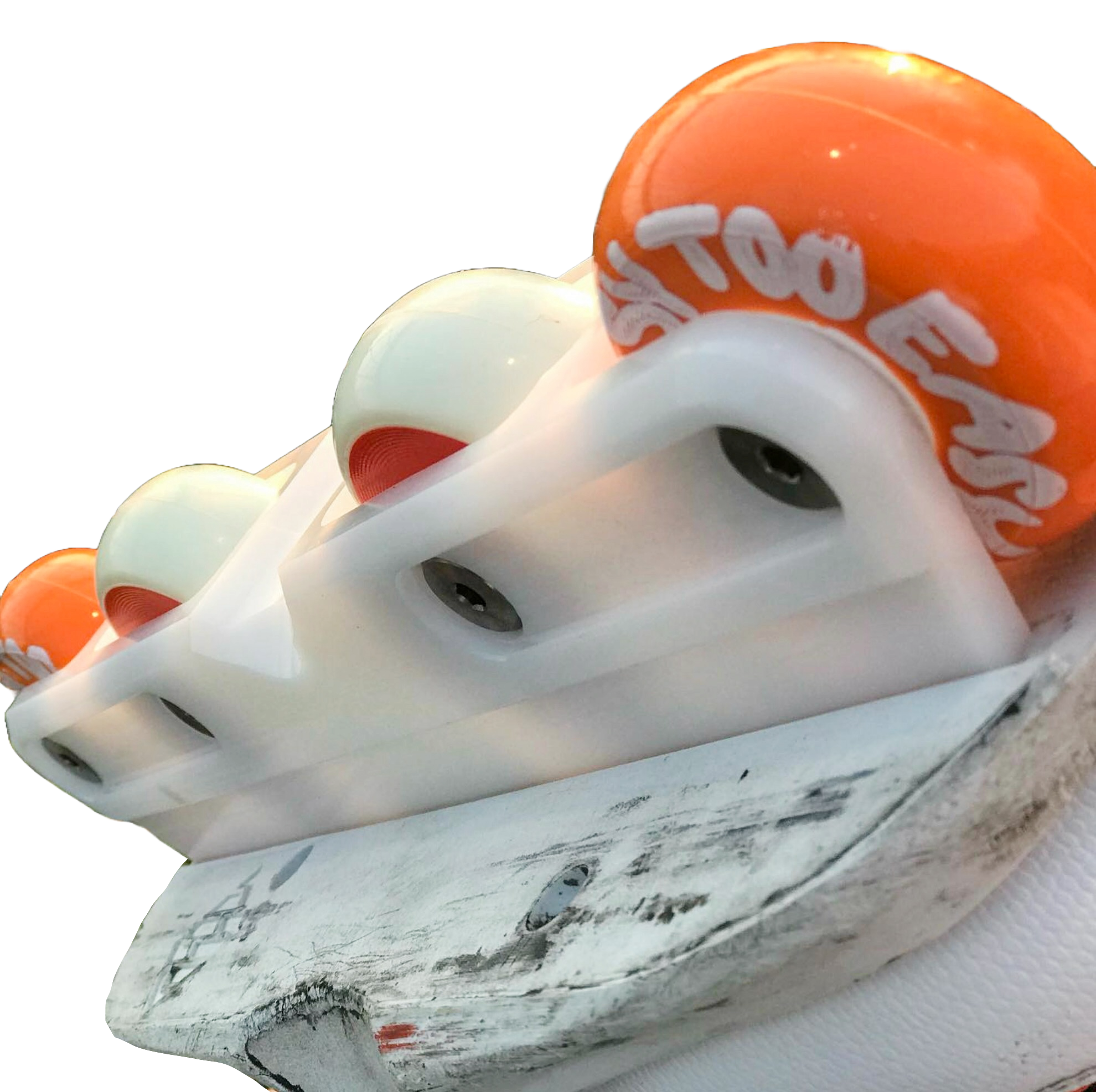
Small & hard wheels

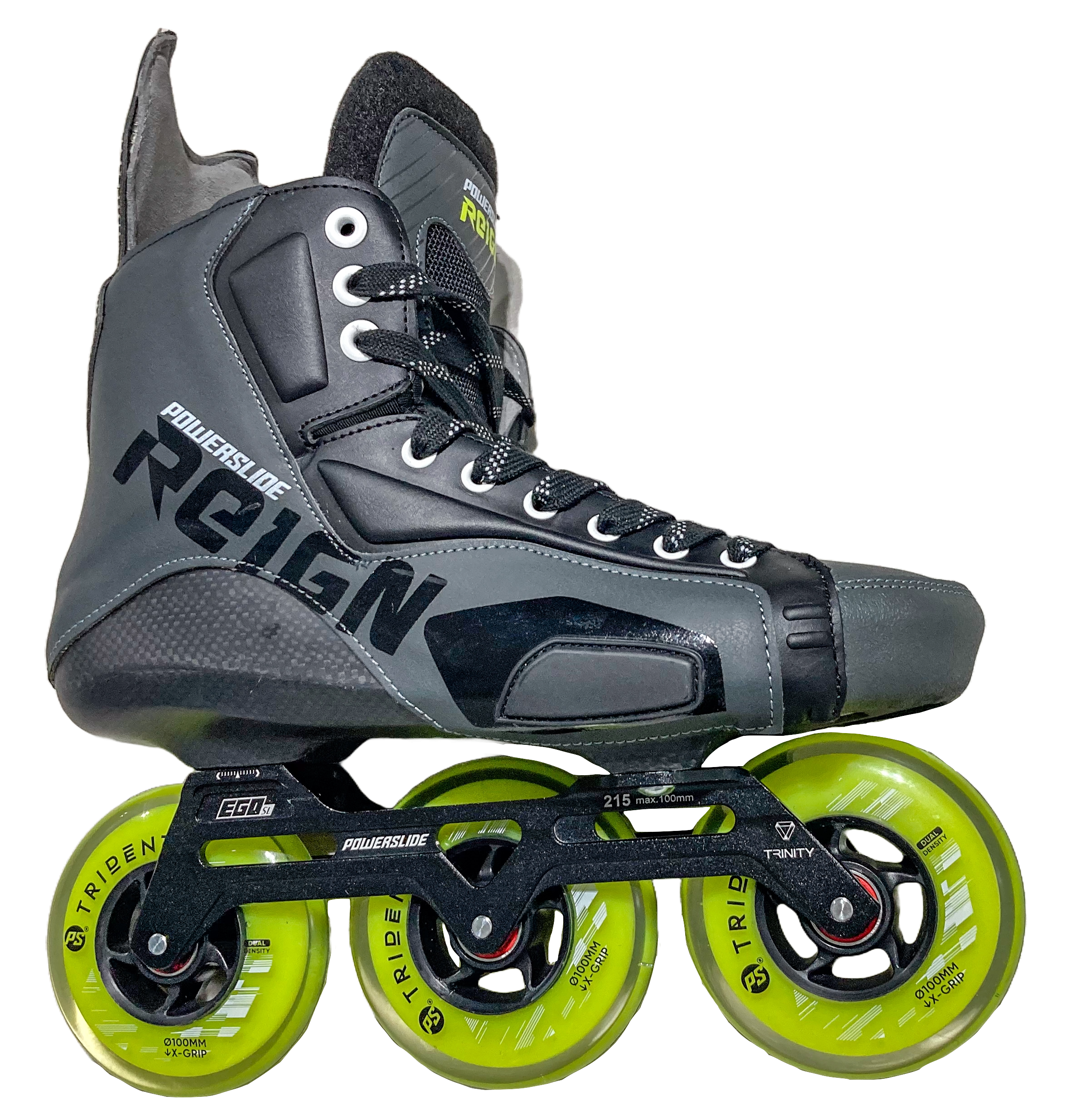
large & soft wheels

In the early 1980s, Scott Olson similarly repurposed polyurethane wheels from roller skates, shaving down tens of thousands to fit the skates sold by his company, Ole’s Innovative Sports – later known as Rollerblade. The same qualities that made polyurethane wheels ideal for skateboarding, such as durability, impact resistance, and a smooth ride, also benefited inline skating. This innovation helped bring inline skating out of obscurity and transform it into a popular outdoor sport during the 1980s.

What truly set polyurethane (or urethane) apart from previous wheel materials was its versatility. As an elastomer, it could be molded into any shape, and formulated to achieve a wide range of properties including color, hardness, grippiness and rebound. This adaptability allowed for the development of specialized wheels for different inline skating disciplines, from large, hard wheels with pointed bullet profiles for outdoor racing to small, soft wheels with rounded profiles for indoor hockey. (Note: Ricardo Lino toured the factory floor of Aend Industries, a polyurethane wheel factory, with co-owner Tony Gabriel. Discussions cover all aspects of wheel-making, including history of the company, co-ownership with Neil Piper, machines bought from Tom Peterson, brands they OEM for, injection molding of hubs (cores), trimming of hubs, polyurethane coloring, urethane bonding, dual-density urethane, hardness vs grippiness, hardness vs profile, heating of urethane before pouring, casting urethane into molds, baking after casting, cutting/shaving wheels to final profile, quality control, washing, printing, and packaging.)

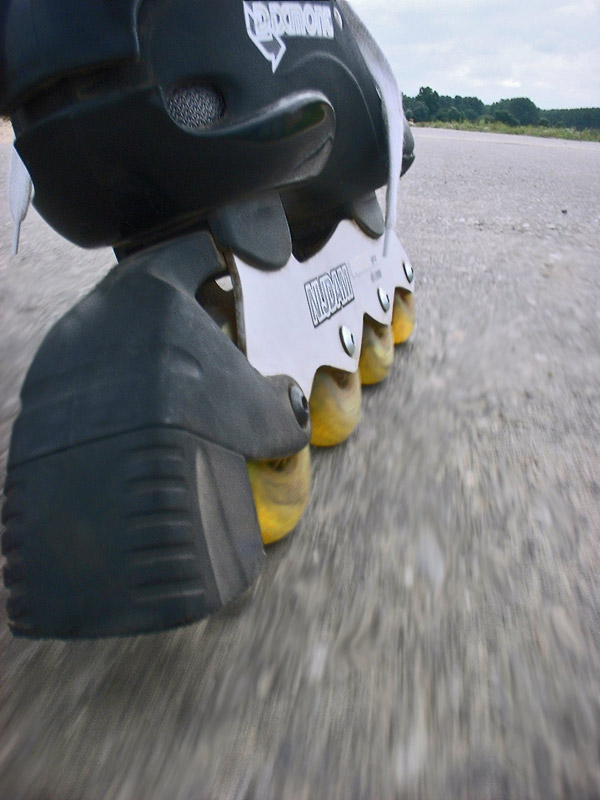
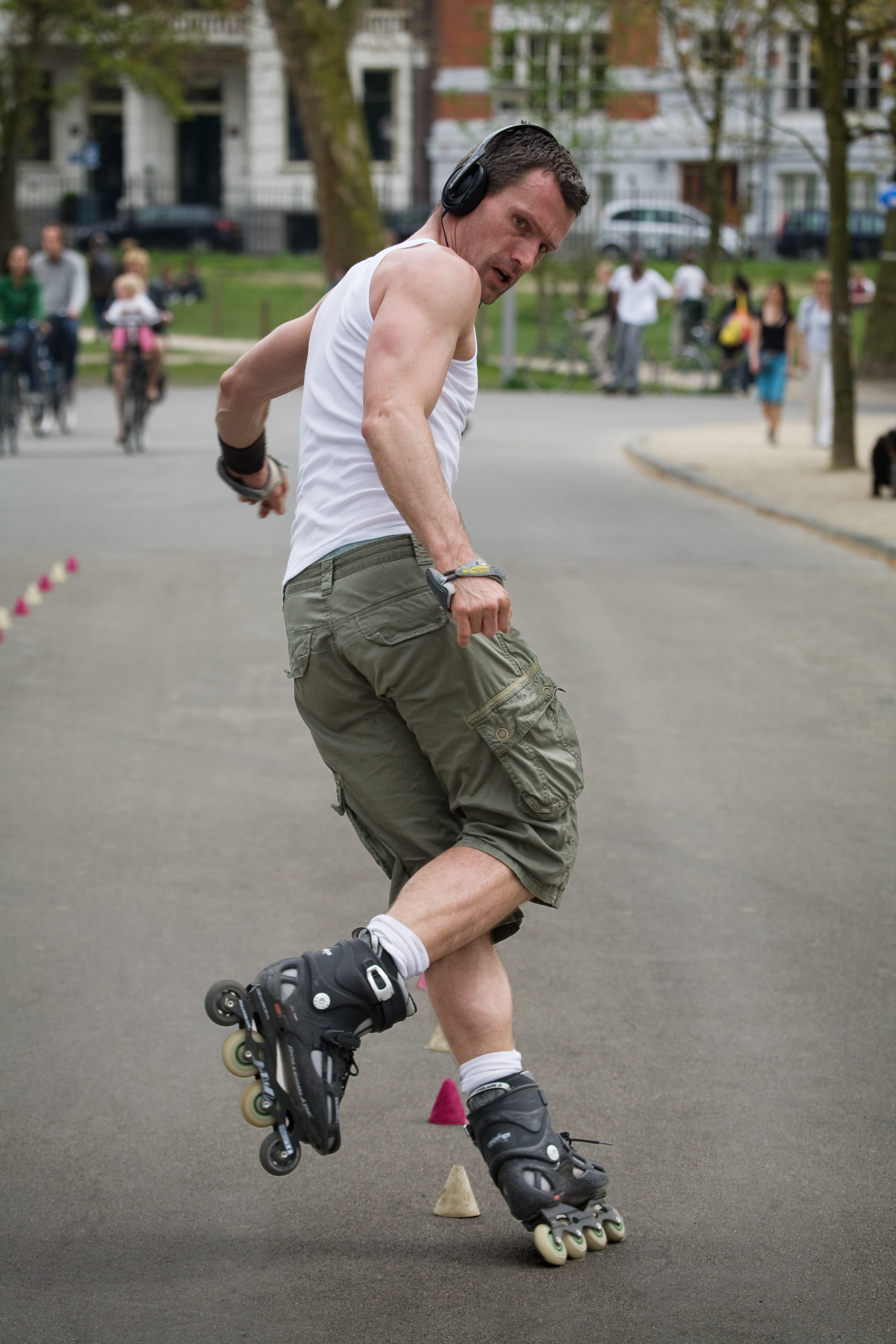
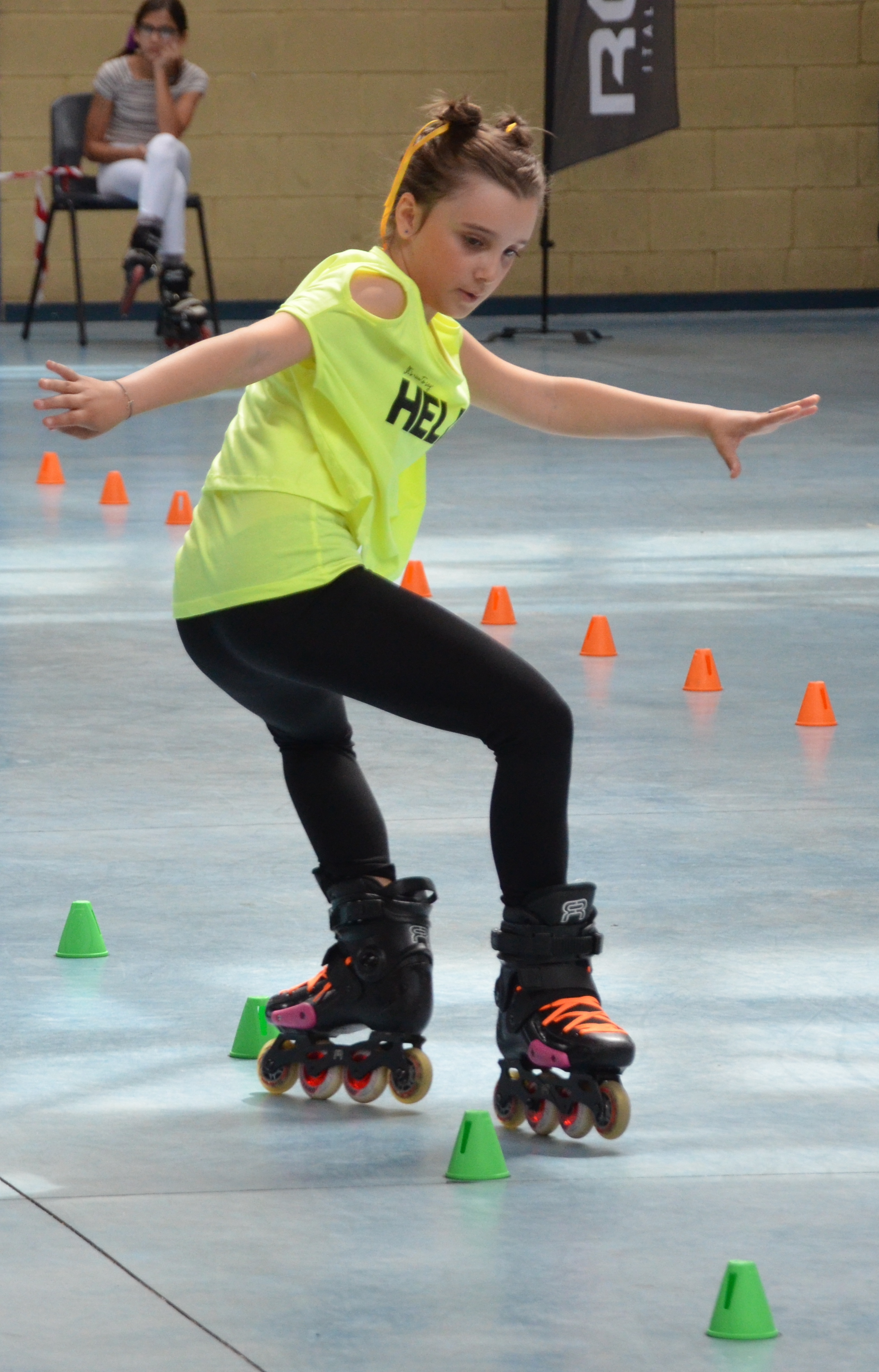
Rebound improves performance

Another remarkable aspect of a polyurethane compound is that it can be formulated to achieve high elasticity, regardless of the desired values for other properties such as hardness. In material science, this elasticity is often measured with the Bayshore Resilience test. In the inline skating industry, it is referred to as wheel rebound. A wheel with high rebound efficiently converts energy from a skater's stride into acceleration, while a wheel with low rebound dissipates much of that energy, leaving little to propel the skater forward. High-rebound wheels are beneficial across all inline skating disciplines, enhancing performance and efficiency. (Note: See table in the Gallagher article showing polyurethane compounds with varying hardness from 60A to 95A and varying rebound values (Bayshore Resilience) from 25% to 60%, with no correlations. A YouTube video (archived) from the article demonstrates "polyurethane resilience" tests (yet another name for Bayshore Resilience) showing two balls with the same hardness, but opposite rebound values. At 0:41, an inline skate wheel with high rebound was shown bouncing off the floor.)

== Structure ==
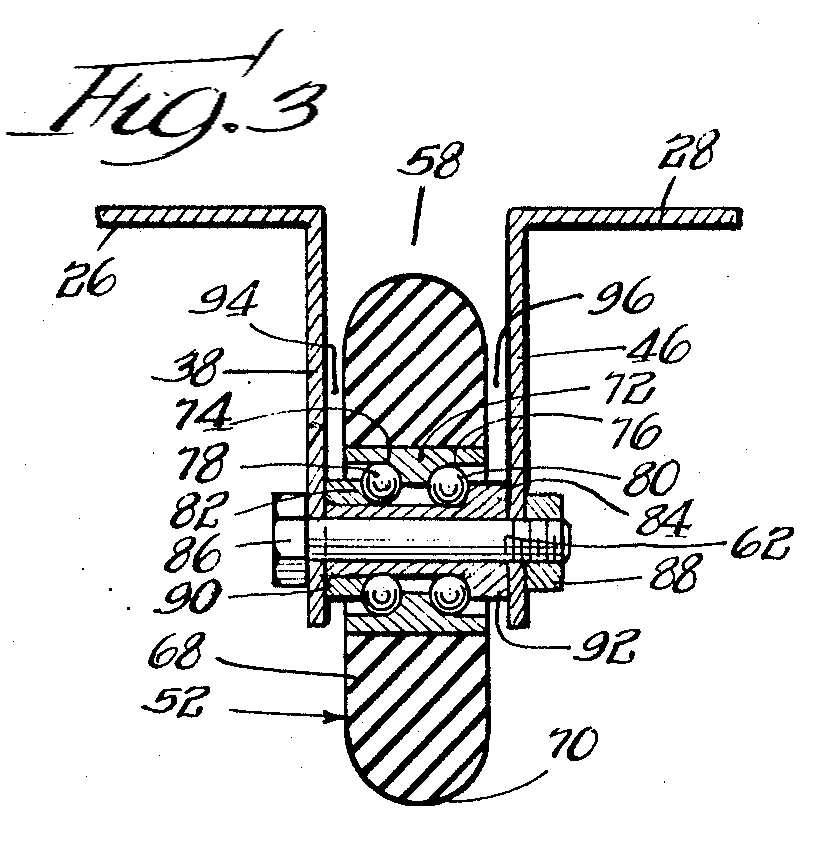
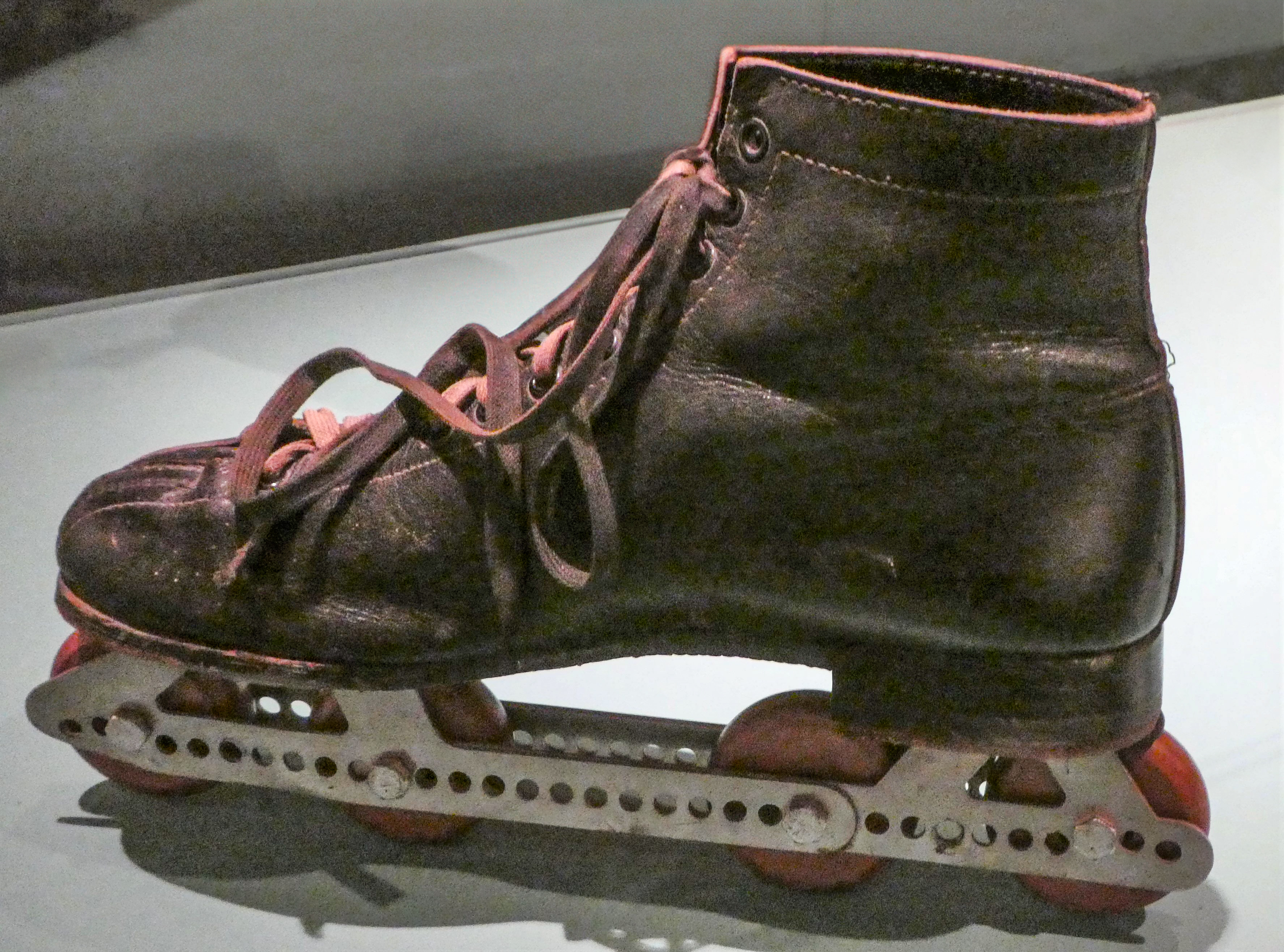
Rubber wheel & press-fit bearing
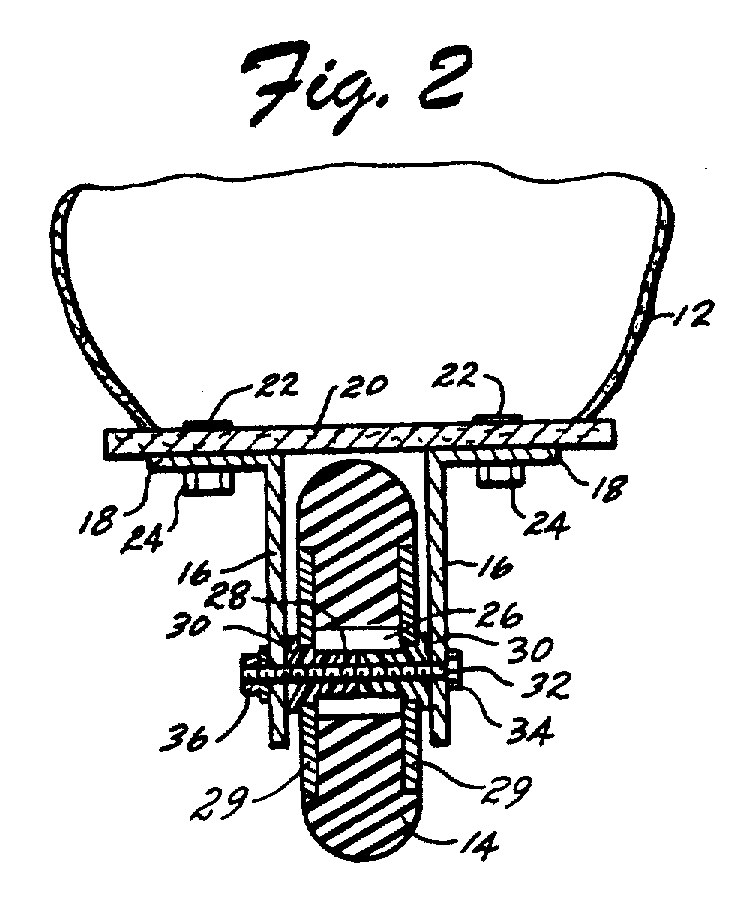
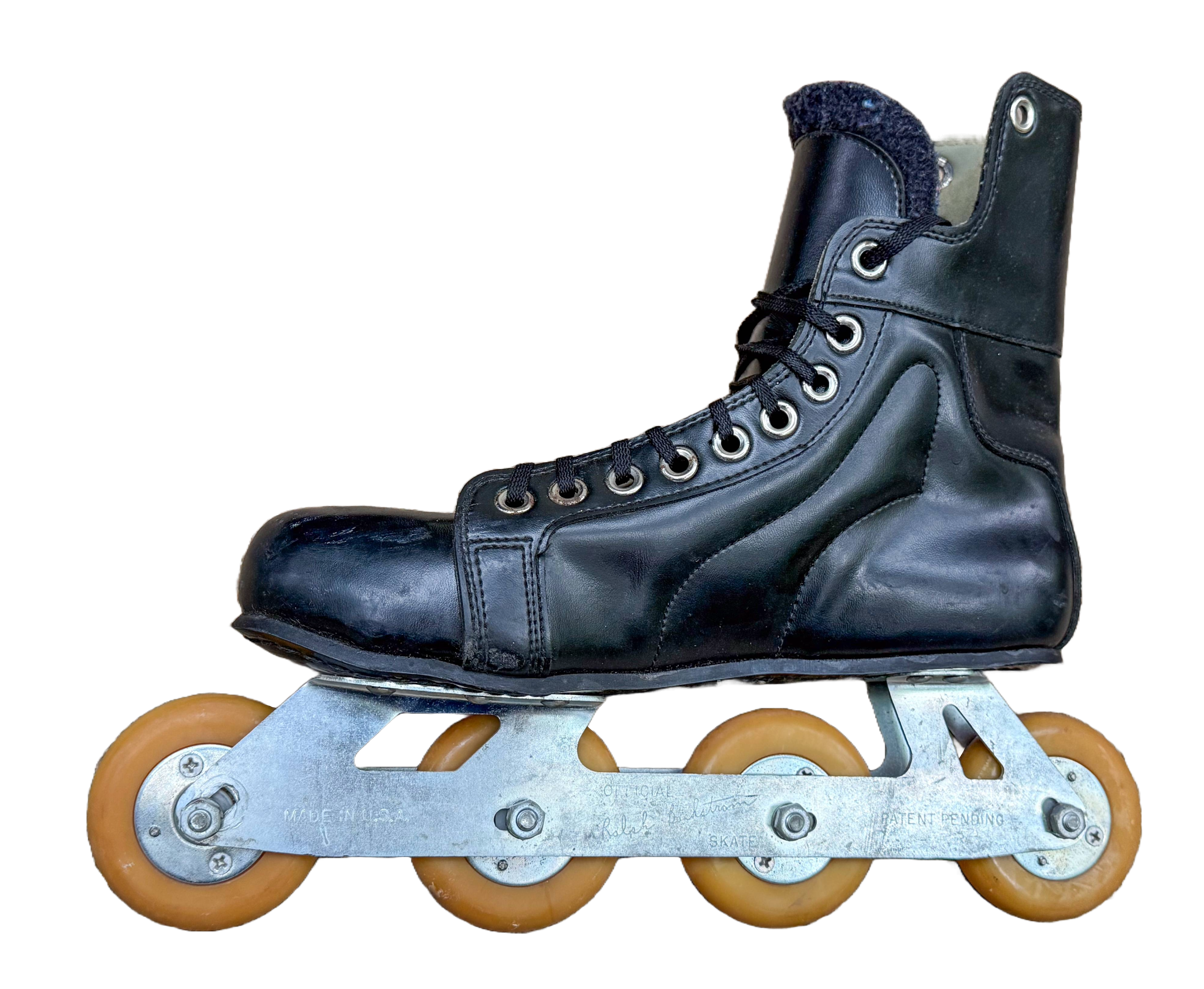
bearings enclosed by metal discs

From the 1910s to the 1970s, many wheeled skates served as precursors to modern inline skates. Most of these early skates featured small wheels made of rubber or rubber reinforced with fibers, often with relatively simple constructions. In many cases, the wheel was merely a rubber ring shaped like a donut, with a bearing cylinder press-fit into its hollow center – an example of which can be seen in the 1966 Chicago Roller-Blade. Other designs incorporated two metal discs to enclose the bearing cylinder more securely within the rubber wheel, as seen in the 1975 Super Sport Skate.

These early rubber wheels were designed to flex under load, providing grip on road surfaces. Nevertheless, the same elasticity that enhanced their performance also made them increasingly unsuitable for securely housing precision ball bearings, which inline skates began adopting from roller skates in the 1980s. A misaligned bearing could cause the wheel to tilt, resulting in constant dragging against the frame. This friction not only impaired performance but also generated heat, which could soften the wheel and further compound the misalignment issue.

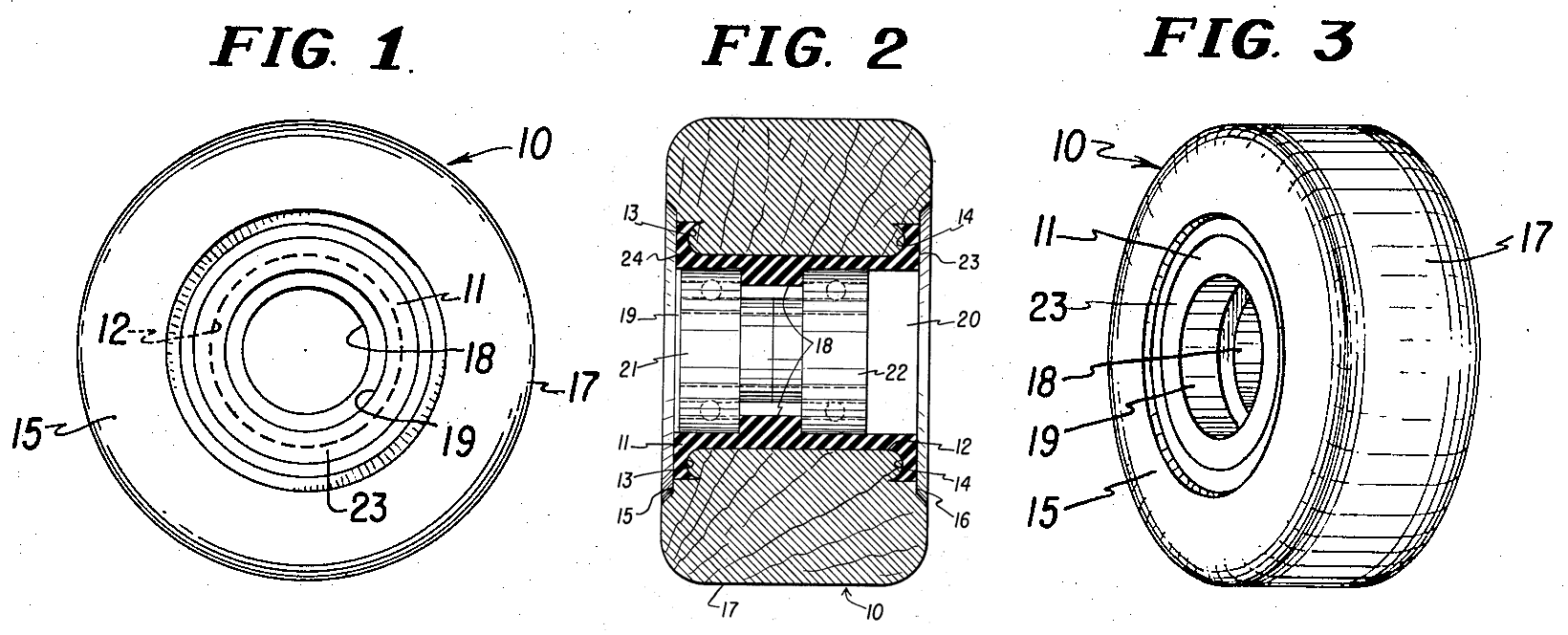
First plastic hub (roller skates)

To address this in roller skates, metal bushings were introduced to hold two ball bearings and a spacer in precise alignment at a 90° angle to the wheel axle. While effective, these bushings added weight and introduced new issues such as metal grinding noises. As plastic became more common, metal bushings were replaced by injection-molded plastic hubs. These single-piece hubs not only securely encased the bearing assembly but also interlocked with the elastic wheel without additional hardware. Furthermore, plastic hubs reduced overall wheel weight, unlike metal bushings, which increased it.

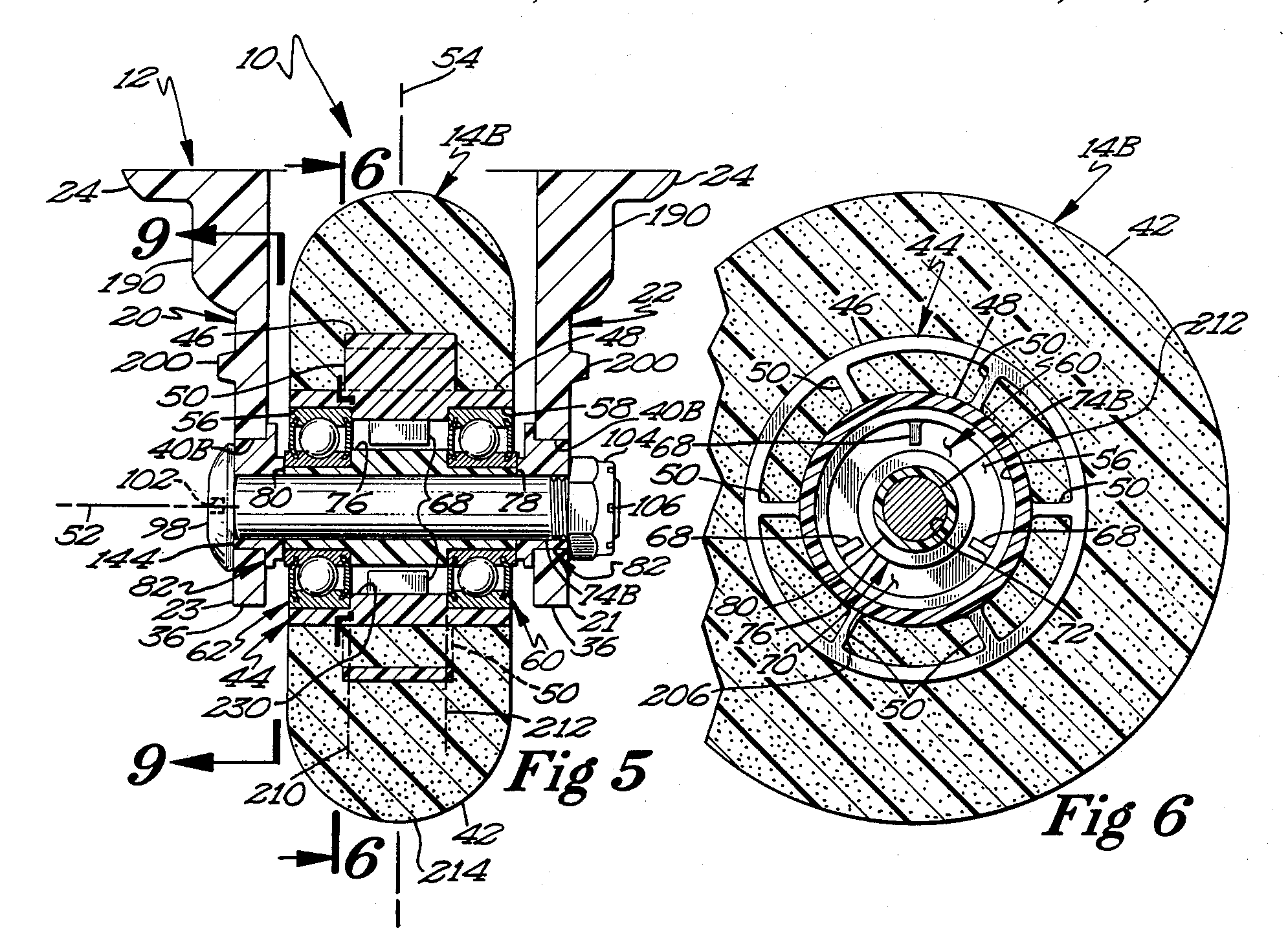
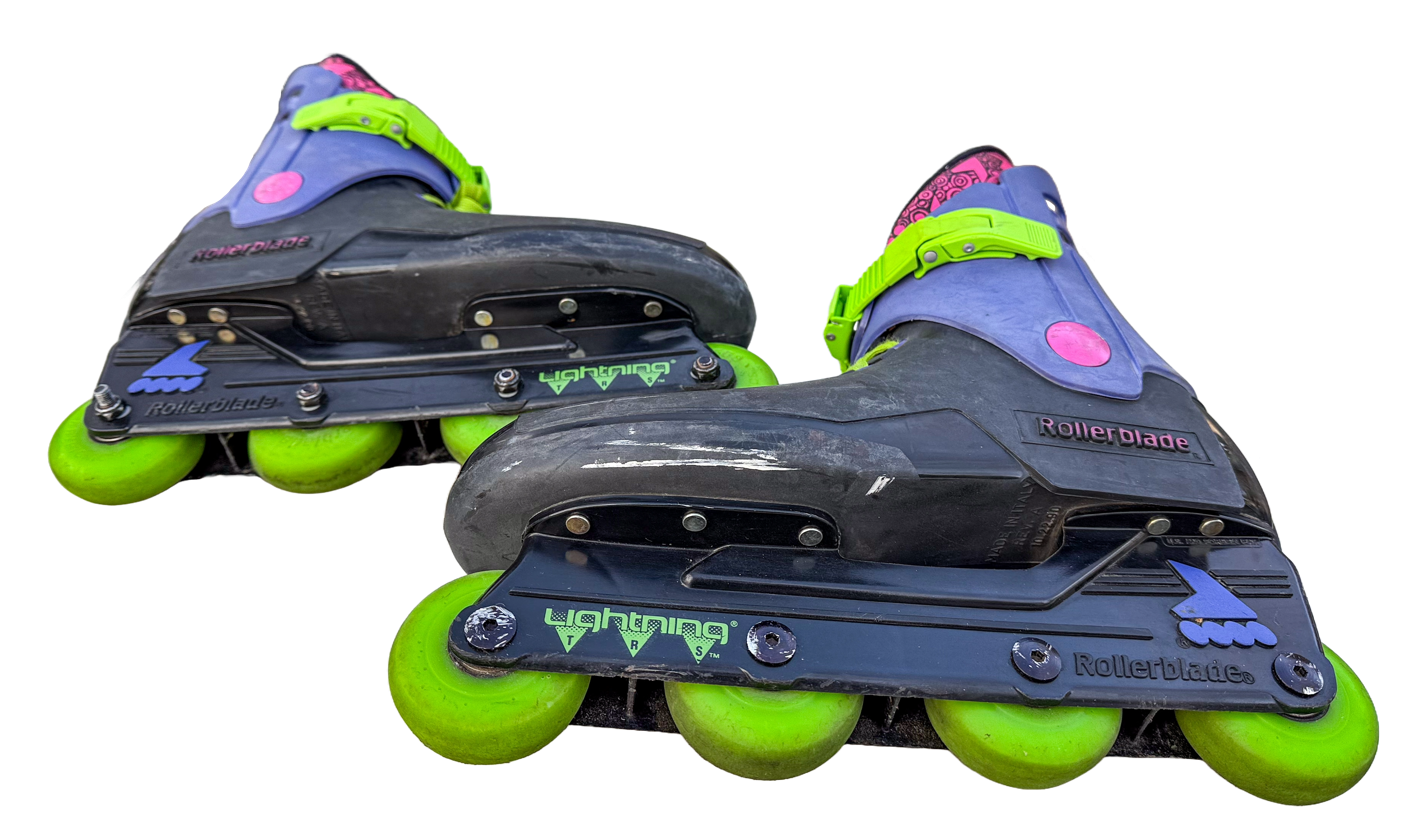
Polyurethane tire molded over a plastic hub - 1988 Rollerblade Lightning patent (left) and skate (right)

In the 1980s, Rollerblade collaborated with Kryptonics to develop polyurethane wheels for inline skates. The inline industry adapted hub innovations from roller skates, integrating them into inline wheels. These wheels were manufactured by placing a plastic hub at the center of a mold and then pouring molten polyurethane around it. The liquid polyurethane flowed into cavities and holes in the hub before settling. As it cooled and solidified, it formed a secure interlock with the hub. (Note: Brennan Olson's patent application filed in 1987 described key innovations in the 1988 Lightning skate: a single-piece plastic frame with reinforcement bridges, toggleable inserts for mounting hole for rockering (named axle aperture plug in the specification), and wheel hubs each with an interlock rim (named outer annular ring 16P) over which polyurethane is molded to reduce wheel deformation and heat buildup.) (Note: Page 79 of Skaters magazine from 1990 features a Kryptonics ad showing the cross section of a Kryptonics wheel with polyurethane molded over a hub through holes in its interlock rim. Page 77 of the same 1990 Skaters magazine features a Rollerblade ad stating that Kryptonics is the official wheel supplier for rollerblade skates.)

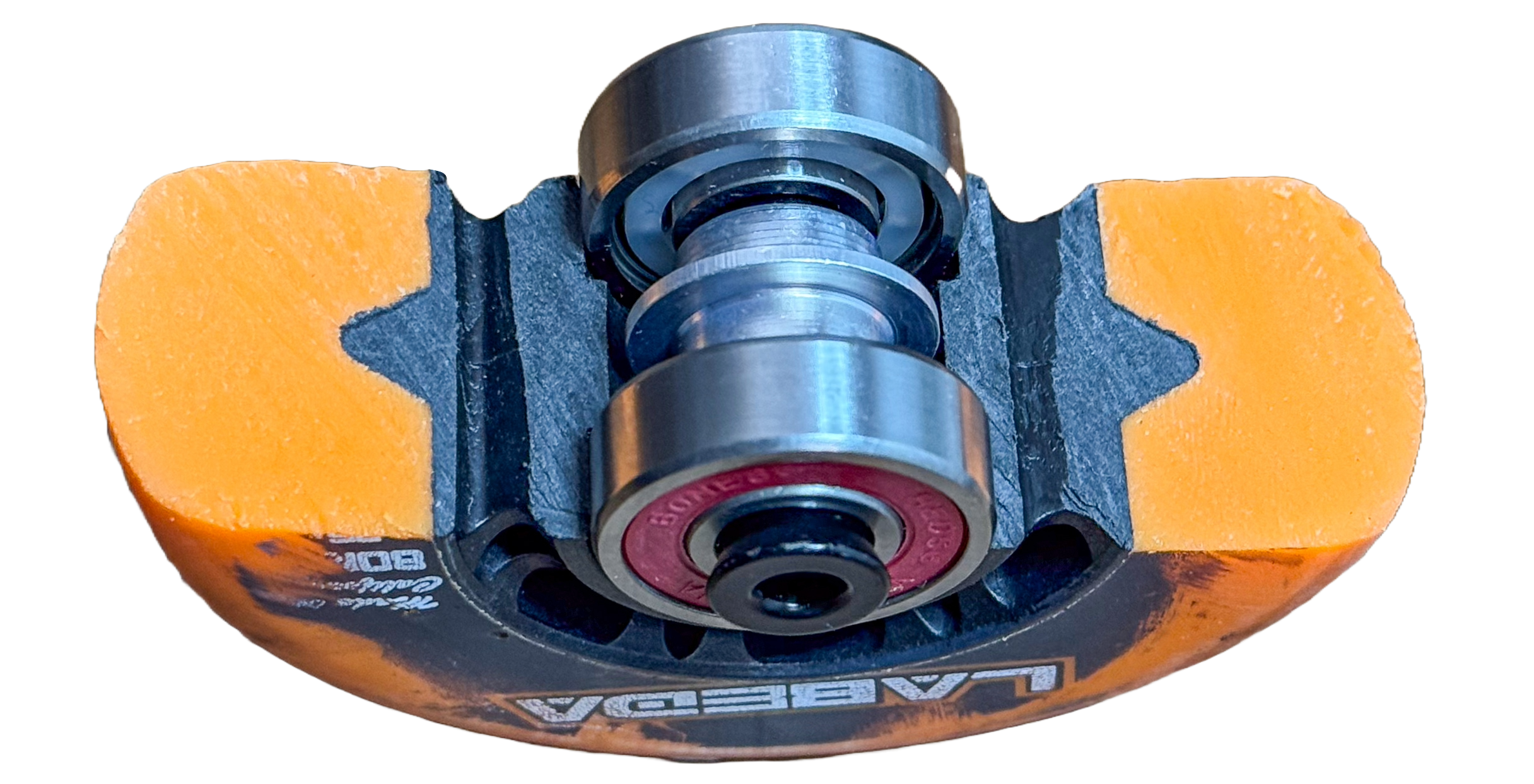
Wheel cross section

Modern inline wheels consist of two main components: an outer polyurethane tire, shaped like a donut, and an inner plastic hub, also known as a core. The hub features a hollow center designed to accommodate a spacer and two ISO 608 ball bearings. Made of hard plastic, the hub securely holds the bearings in place through a friction fit - something the softer polyurethane tire cannot achieve. On the other hand, the soft polyurethane tire is able to deform upon ground contact, cushioning the landing and gripping the ground.

== Hub ==
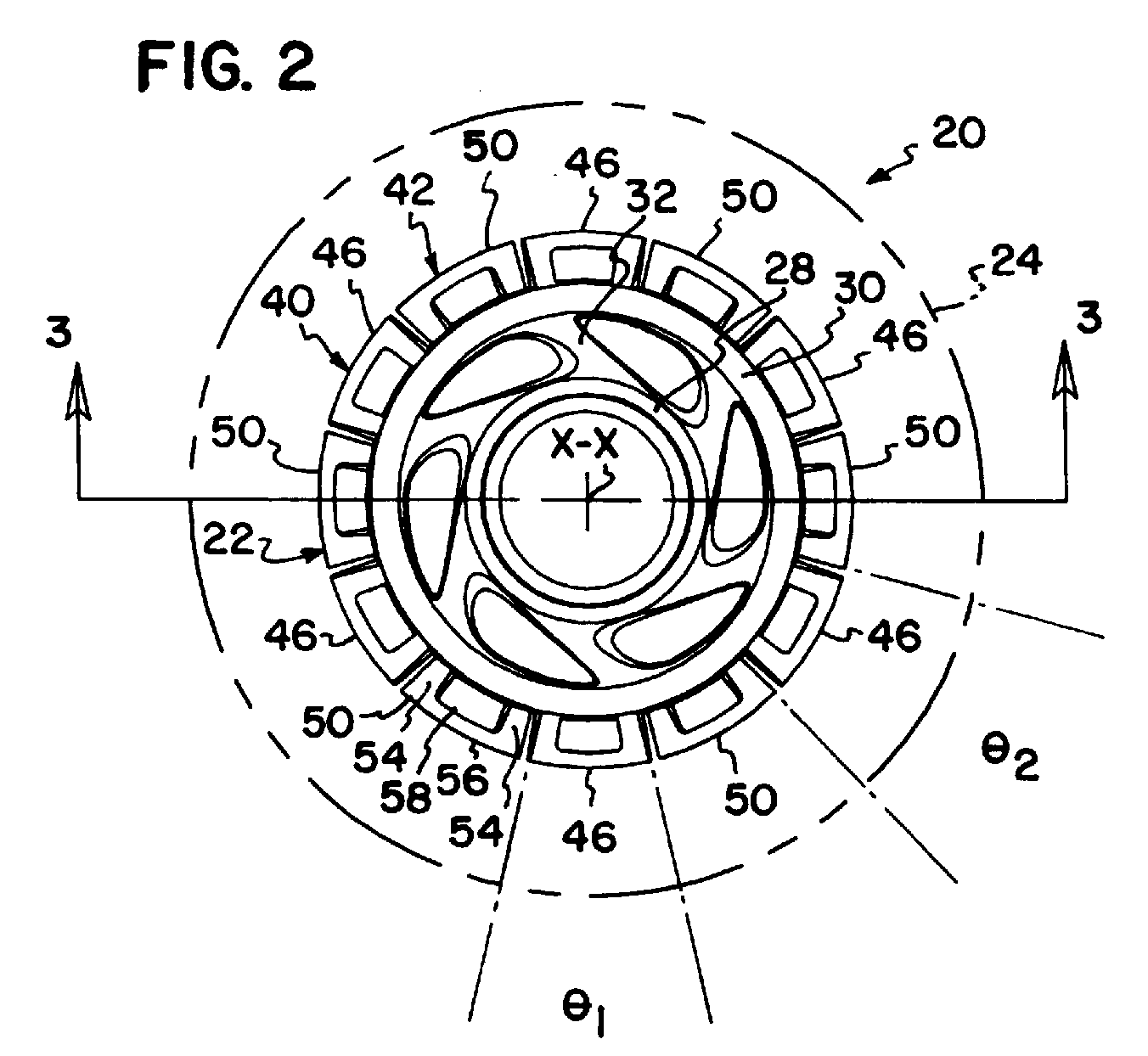
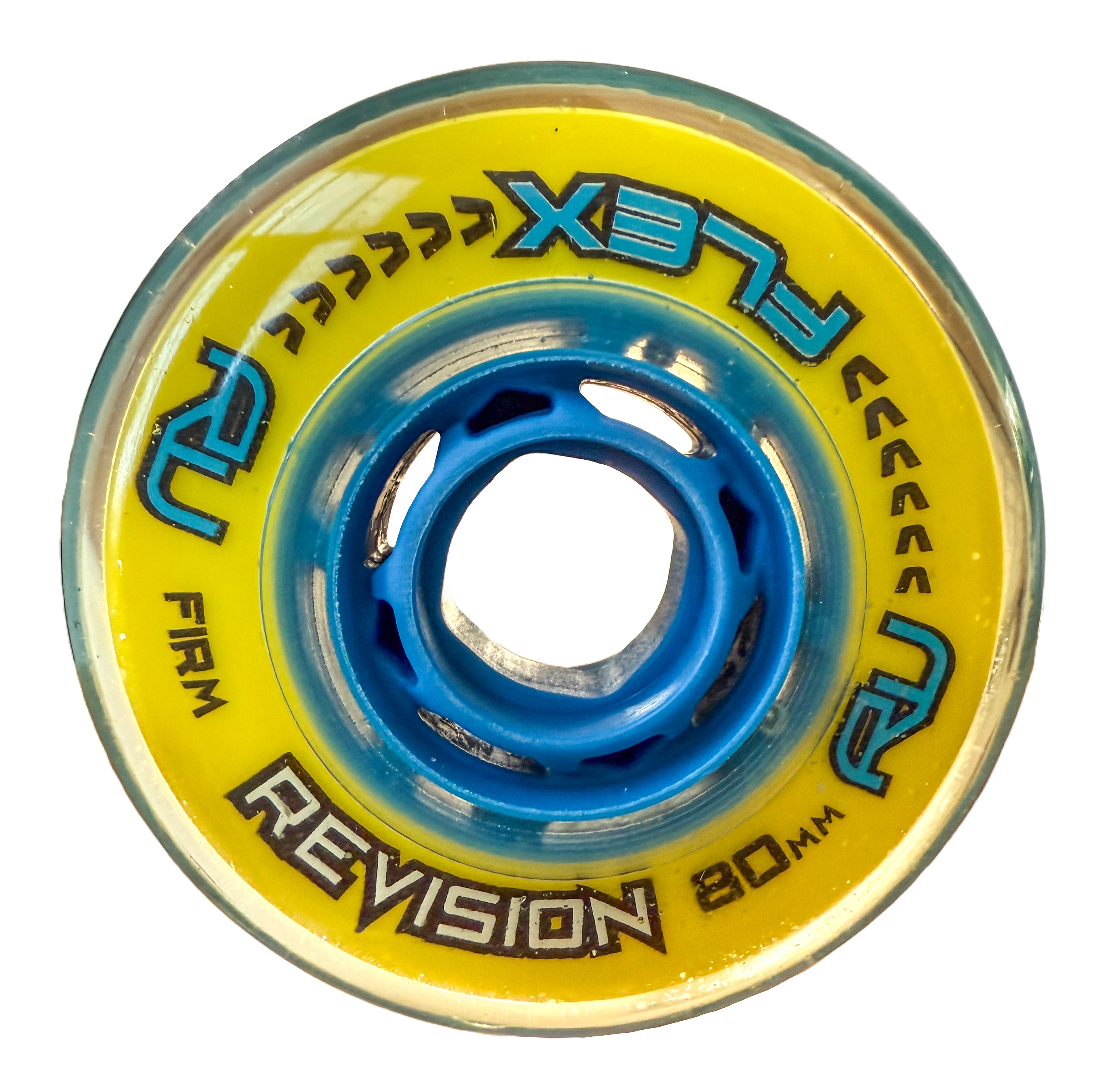
Clear polyurethane tire molded over interlock vanes of a plastic hub
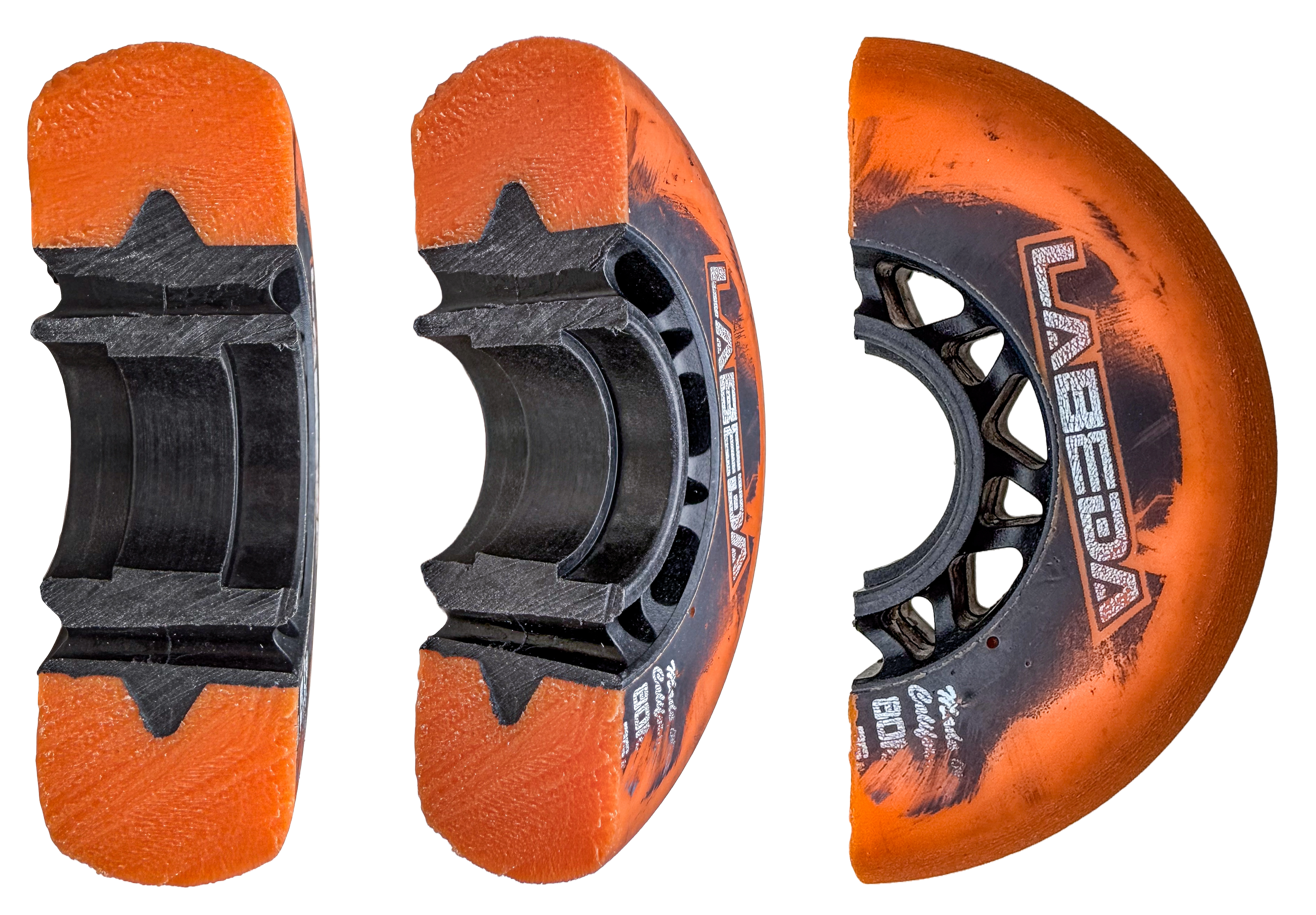
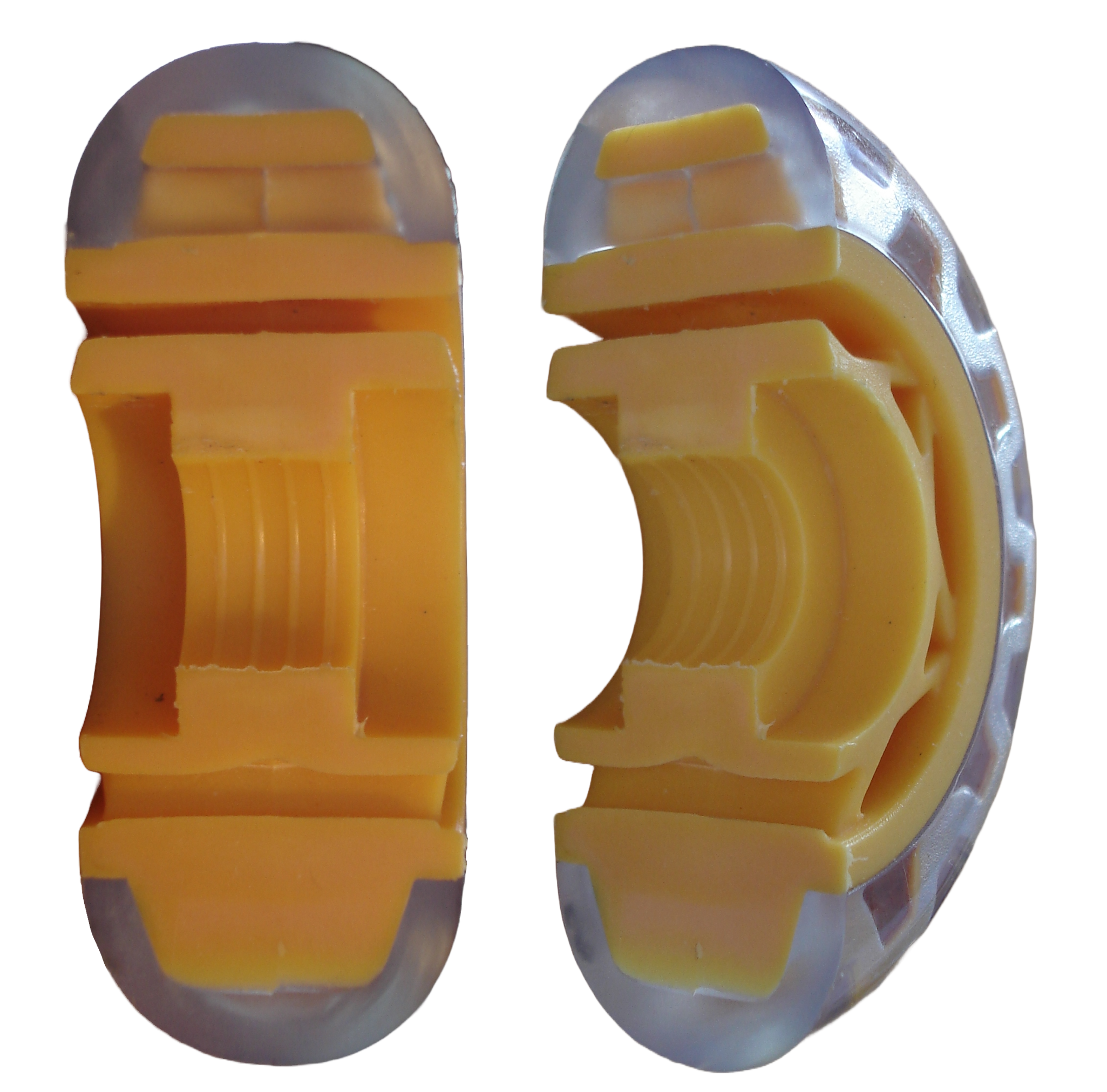
Tire chemically-bonded to the interlock rim (left) vs. mechanical interlock (right)

The outer rim of a wheel hub, known as the interlock, is buried within the polyurethane tire. Unless the tire is made from clear urethane, this rim remains hidden from view. Its size, shape, and design vary depending on the wheel’s outer diameter and the demands of different skating disciplines. Beyond mechanically securing the tire to the hub, the interlock rim also enhances the wheel’s overall structural rigidity. (Note: Brennan Olson's 1987 patent described wheels with polyurethane poured over a hub with an interlock rim (outer rigid ring 46), and showed drawings of the same.)

Some manufacturers apply a bonding agent to the hub before pouring the polyurethane, creating a chemical bond that reduces reliance on mechanical interlocking. Others use polyurethane-blended plastic hubs, such as "Estaloc," developed by Robert J. Labeda of Labeda Wheels in collaboration with B.F. Goodrich, which chemically bonds with the polyurethane tire during the molding process.

The visible portion of the hub varies in size depending on the wheel’s overall dimensions and the requirements of specific skating disciplines. In some small wheels used for aggressive skating, the visible hub may appear as a thin ring between the bearings and the tire, just large enough to serve as a bearing housing. In contrast, larger racing wheels from the 1990s, typically around 82 mm in diameter, often featured hubs occupying nearly 50% of the wheel’s diameter. By the 2020s, even larger wheels from 110 mm to 125 mm feature hubs that take up most of the wheel’s diameter.

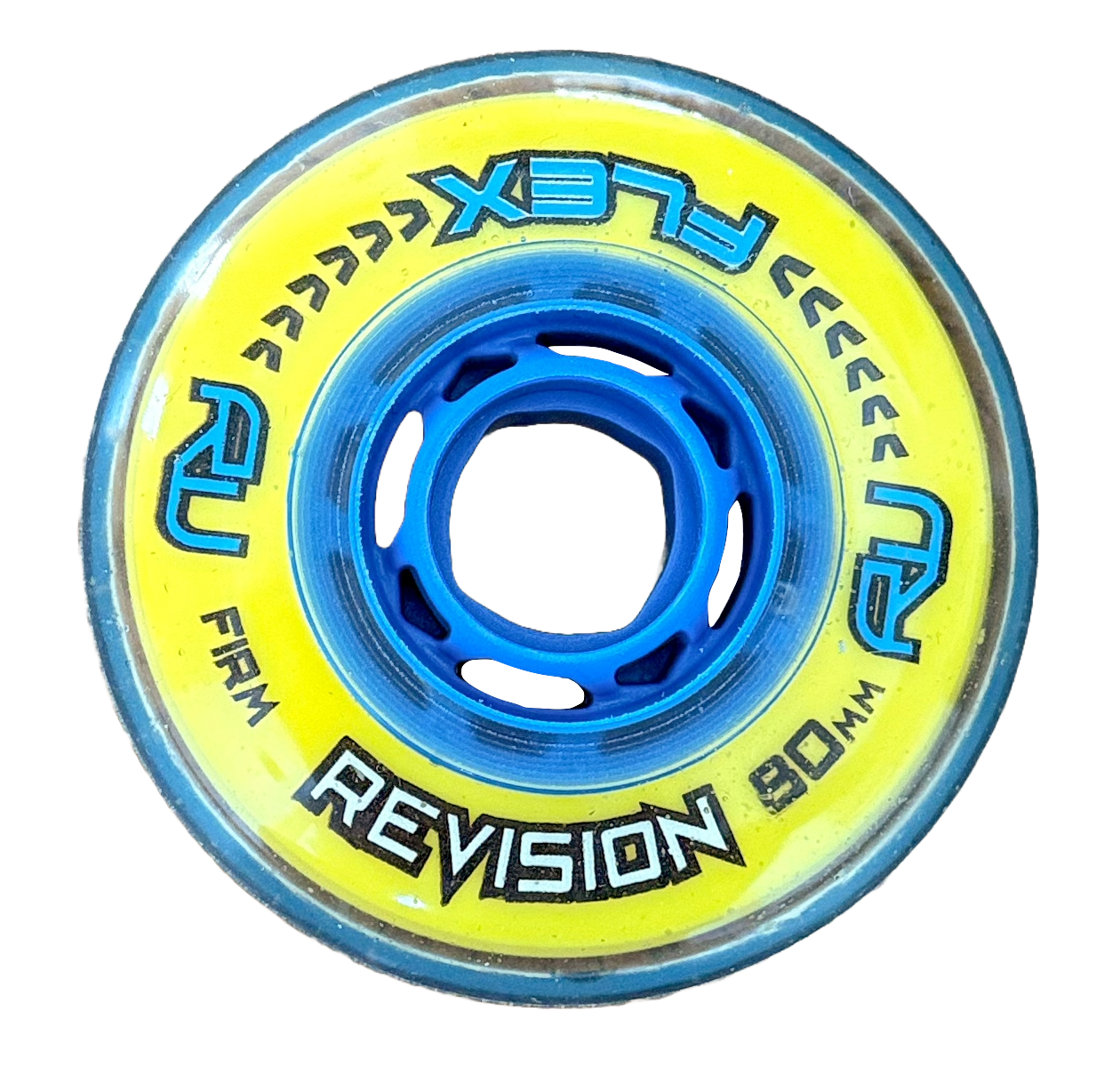
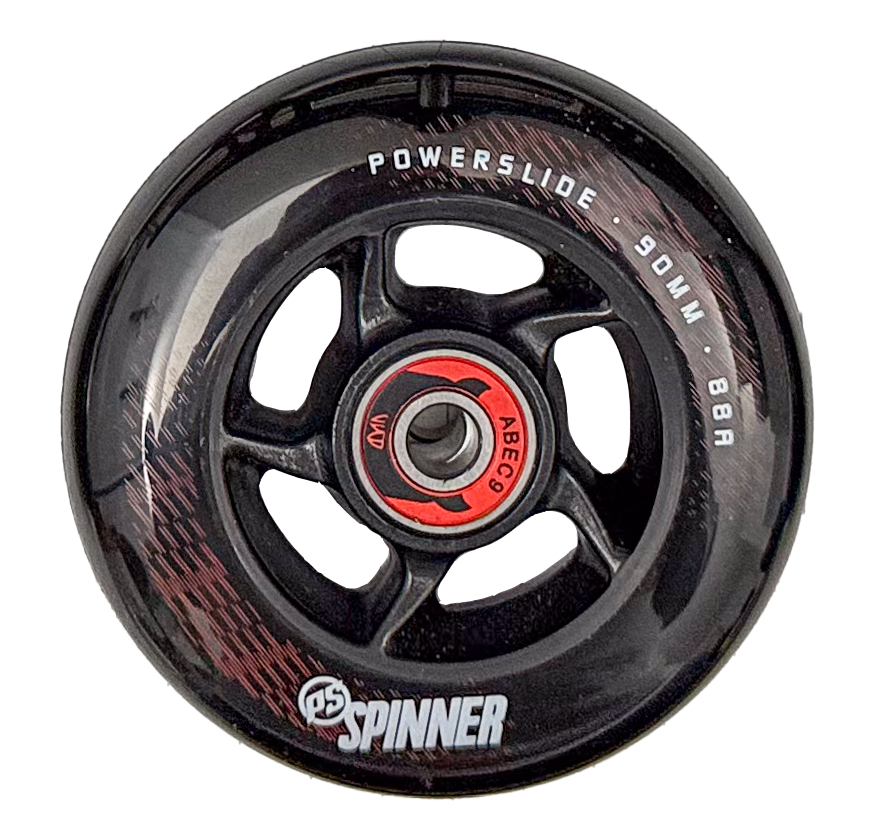
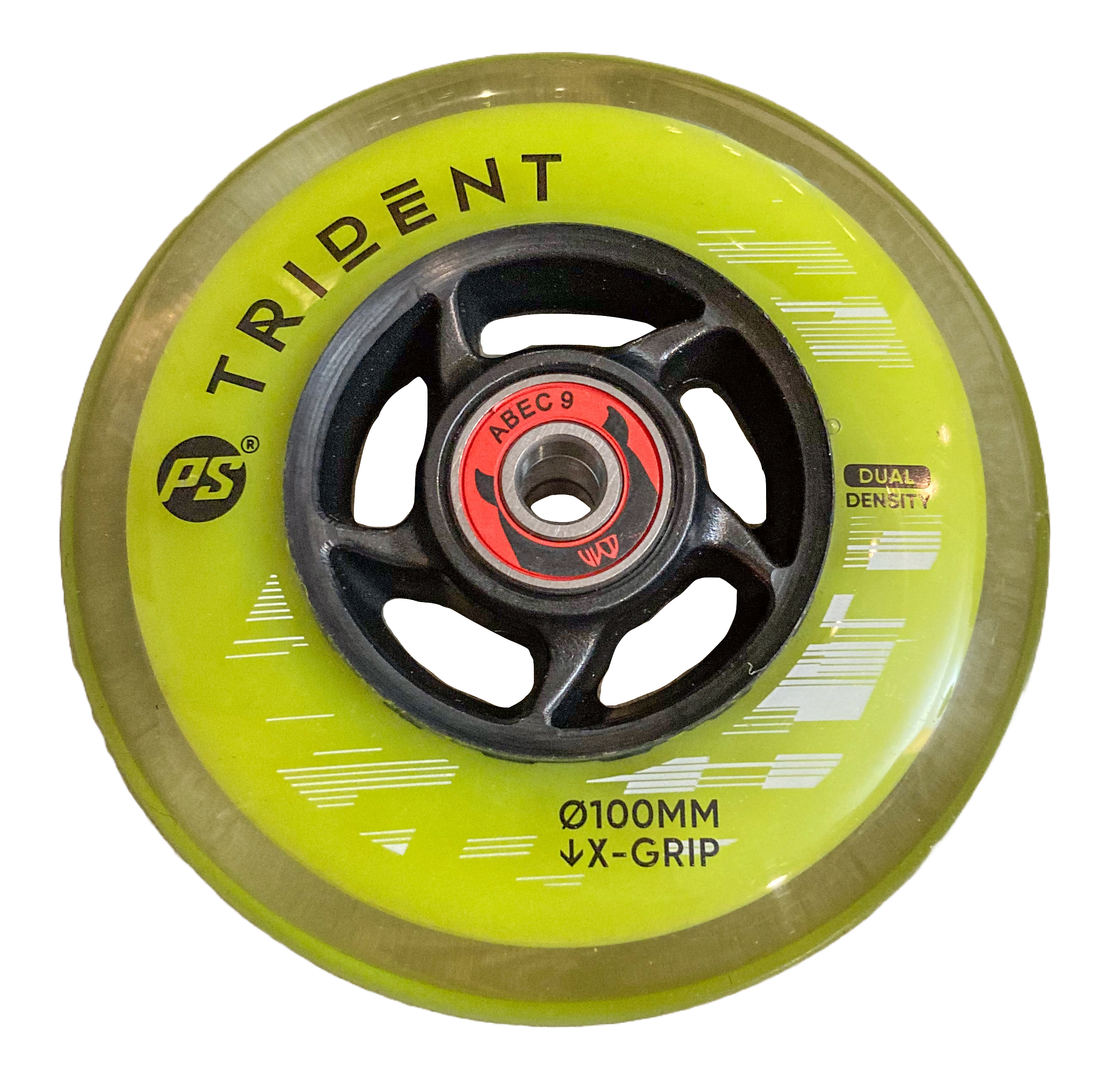
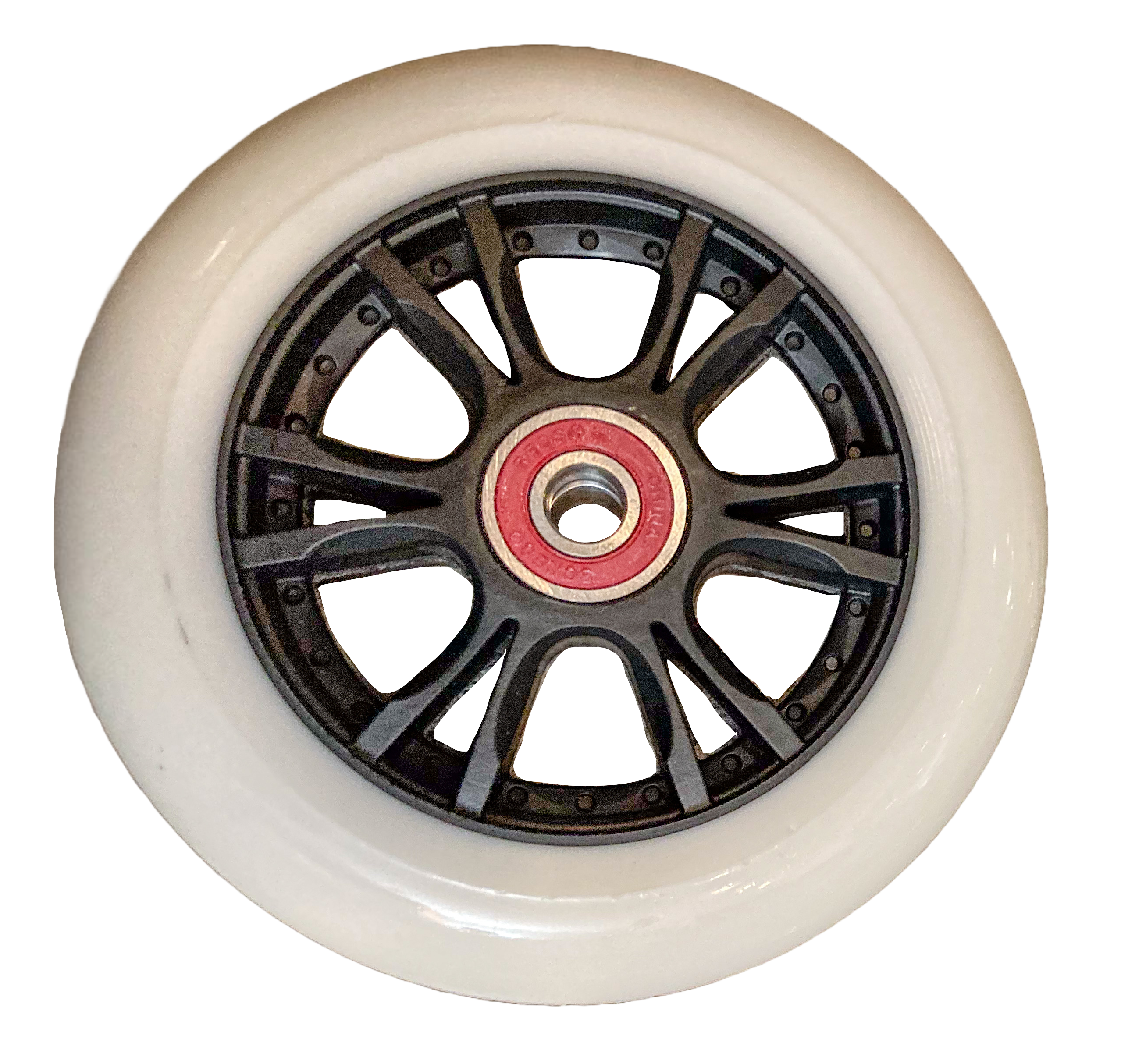
Spoked hubs in 80 mm, 90 mm, 100 mm & 110 mm wheels

A wheel's volume increases in proportion to the square of its diameter given fixed width. Thus a solid polyurethane wheel of substantial size would be prohibitively heavy and excessively flexible, making it impractical for inline skating. Even if the wheel consists of largely a rigid hub, it would still be prohibitively heavy. To address this, large inline wheels adapted design principles from polyurethane stroller wheels, incorporating lightweight yet rigid spoked hubs with an interlock rim to secure the polyurethane tire. These spoked hubs, also known as open cores, feature an outer rim connected to the bearing housing by distinct spokes.

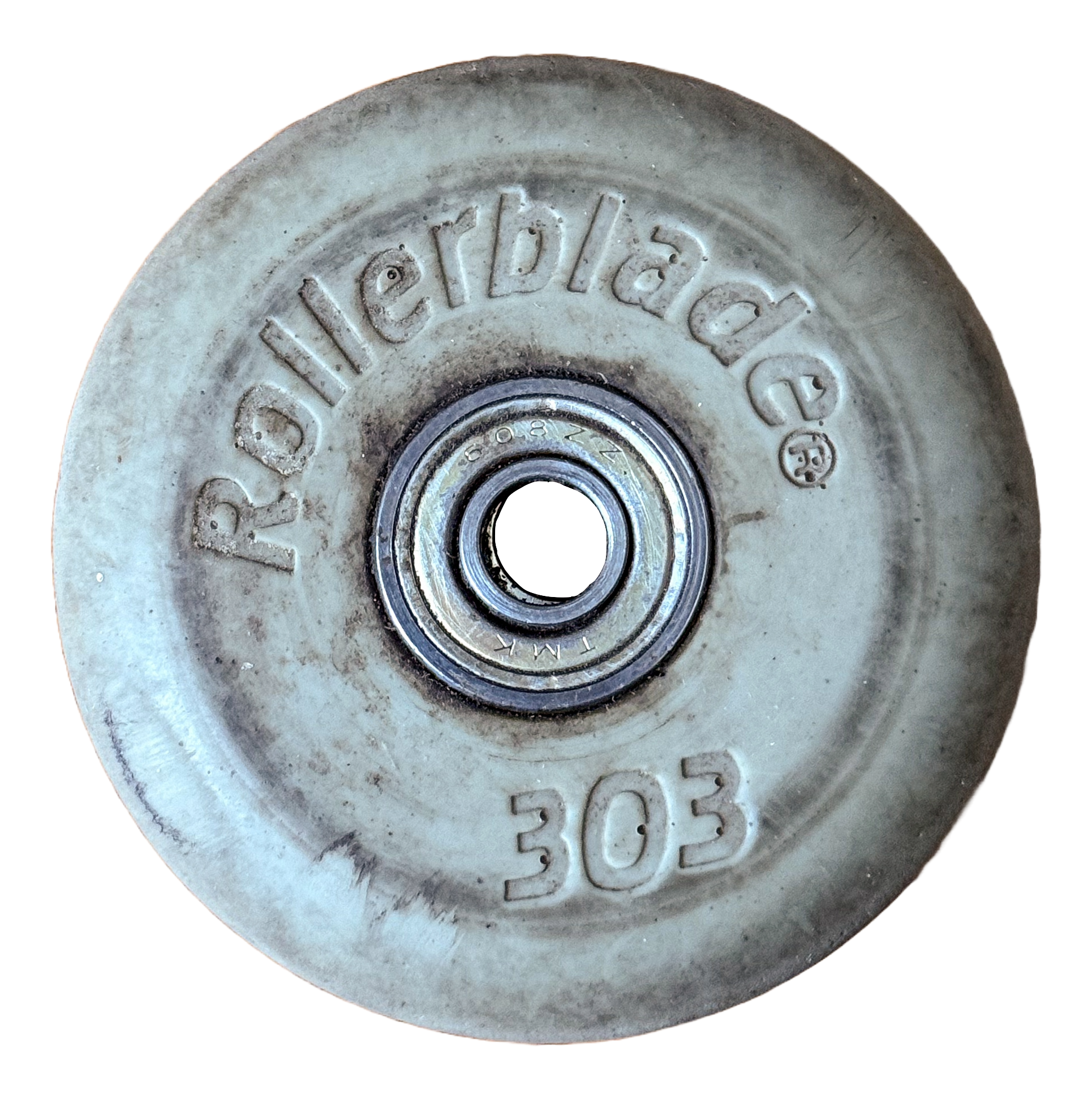
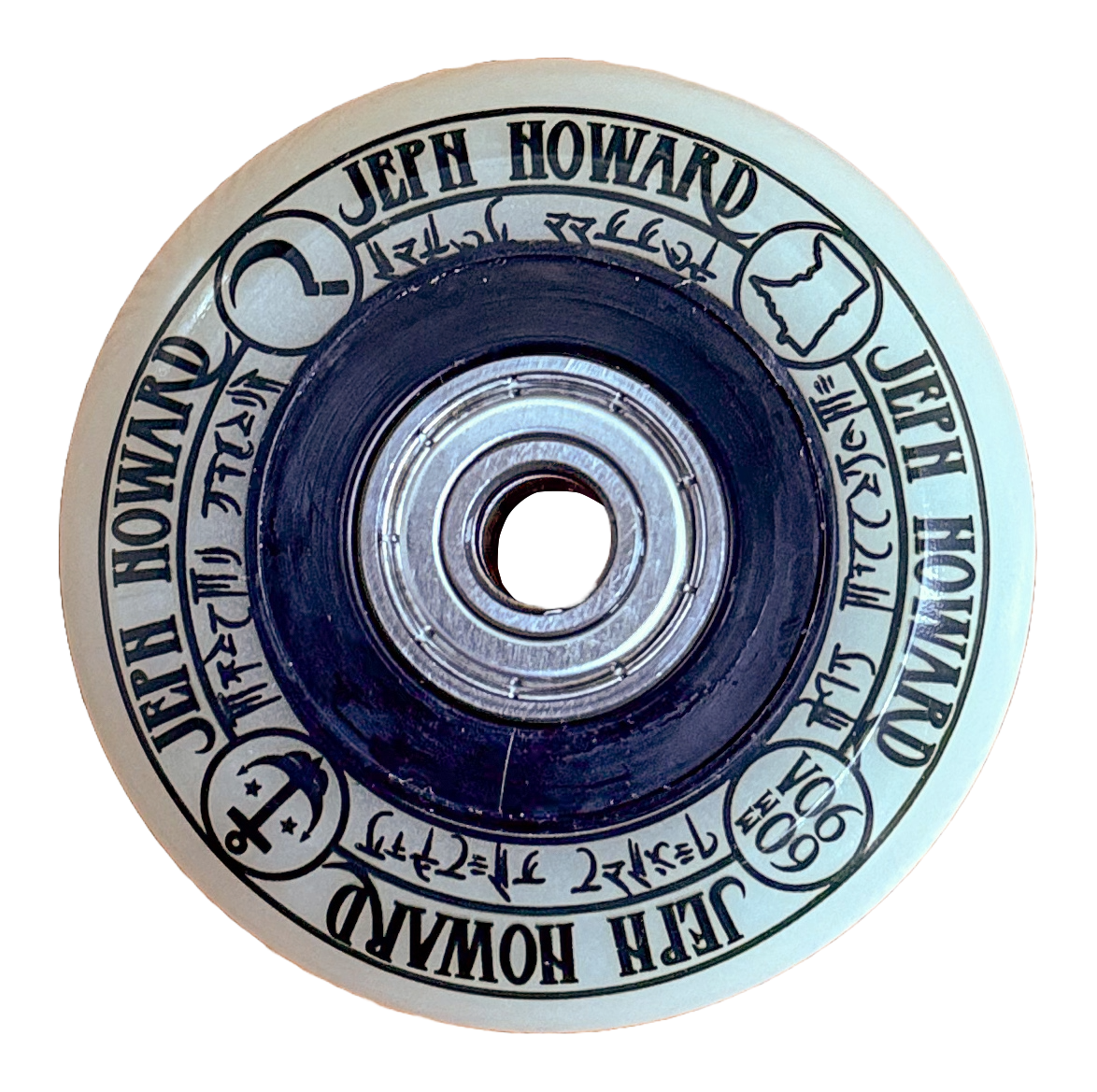
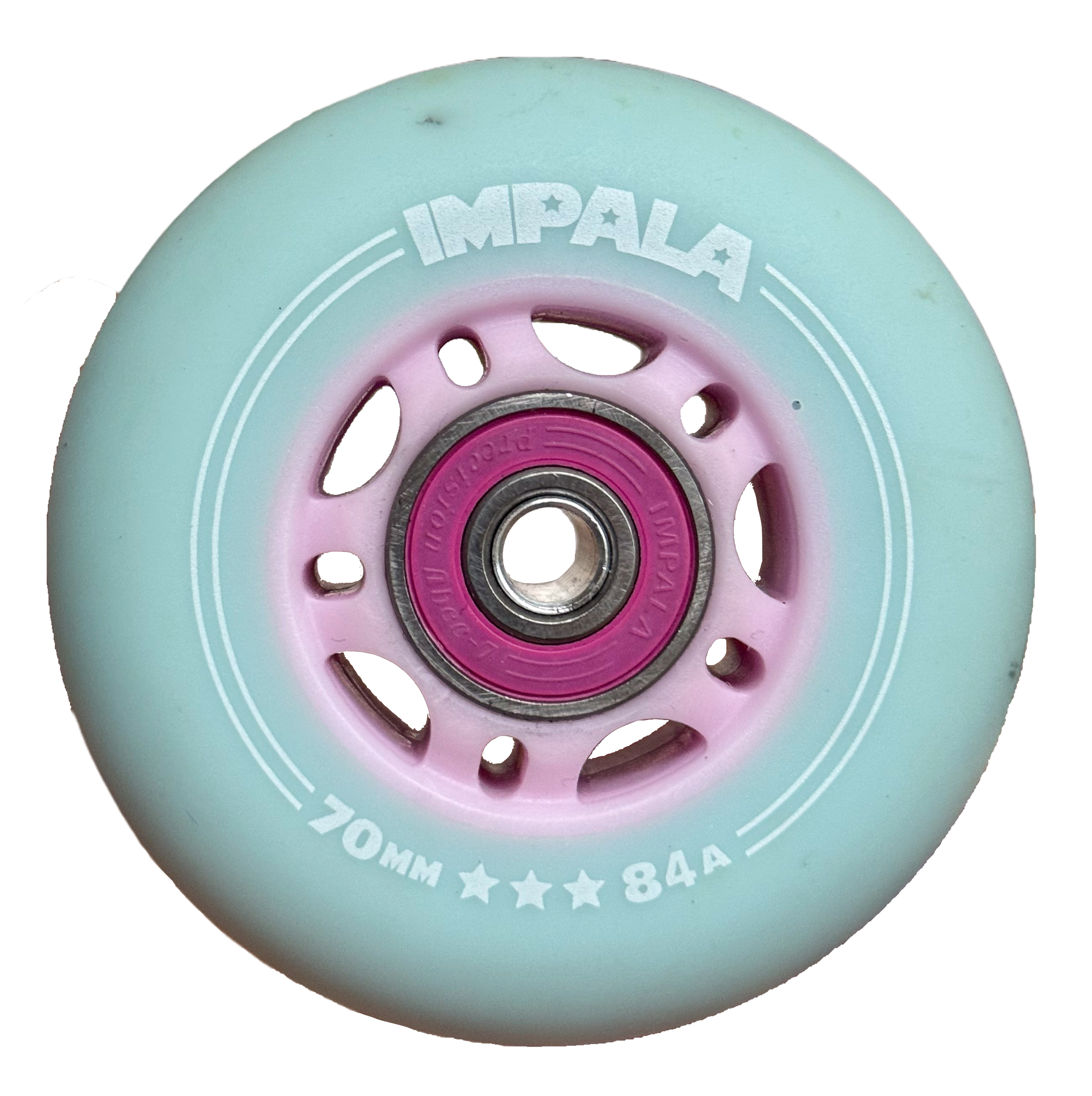
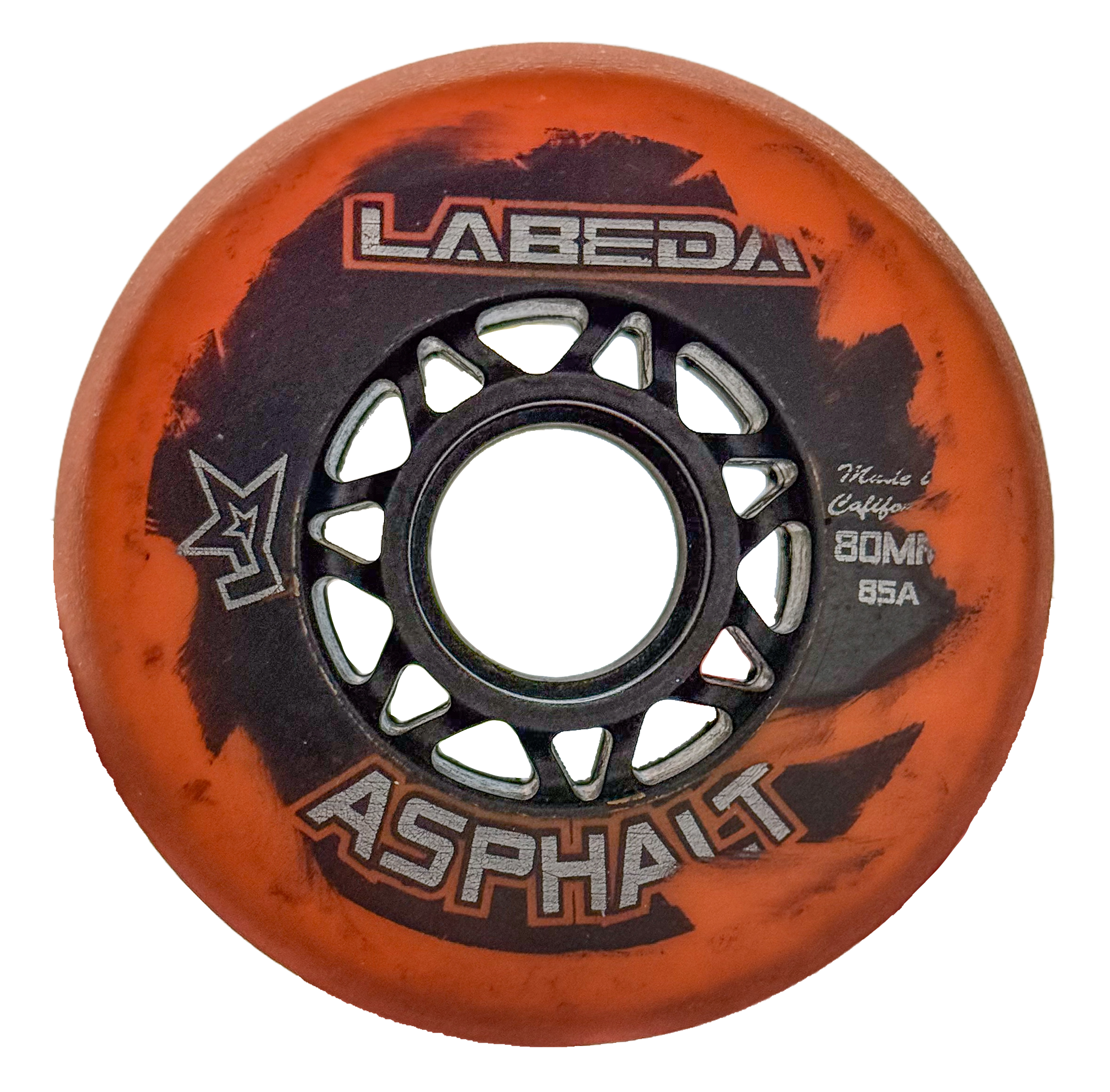
Hubless (no core), closed core, open 70 mm & 80 mm

In contrast, a full hub, also referred to as a closed core, consists of a solid disc with no clear separation between the outer rim and the bearing housing. Between these two designs is the semi-open core, which features a solid disc but with small hollows drilled between the outer rim and bearing housing to reduce weight.

Spoked cores are generally lighter than full cores but may offer reduced rigidity and structural integrity. As a result, aggressive skaters typically favor small wheels with robust full cores to ensure durability against the high impact of jumps and landings. Conversely, speed and marathon skaters prefer large wheels with spoked hubs, as the open core design allows air to circulate around the hub, helping dissipate heat generated by the bearings during prolonged high-speed use. Without adequate heat dissipation, the polyurethane tire may soften, increasing deformation during rolling and potentially leading to separation from the hub.

== Diameter and profile ==
Common diameters and profiles

Inline skate wheels in the 2020s range from as small as 55 mm to as large as 125 mm in diameter. However, the wheel width remains industry-standard at 24 mm, regardless of size. Wheel frames are designed for specific setups, accommodating a set number of wheels of particular diameters. Despite these variations, all frames assume a uniform 24 mm hub width and polyurethane tires no wider than 24 mm.

Wheel profile refers to the shape of the wheel’s contact surface when viewed head-on, that is, the portion of the wheel that touches the ground. While any wheel diameter can, in theory, be paired with any profile, certain combinations prove optimal for different skating disciplines.

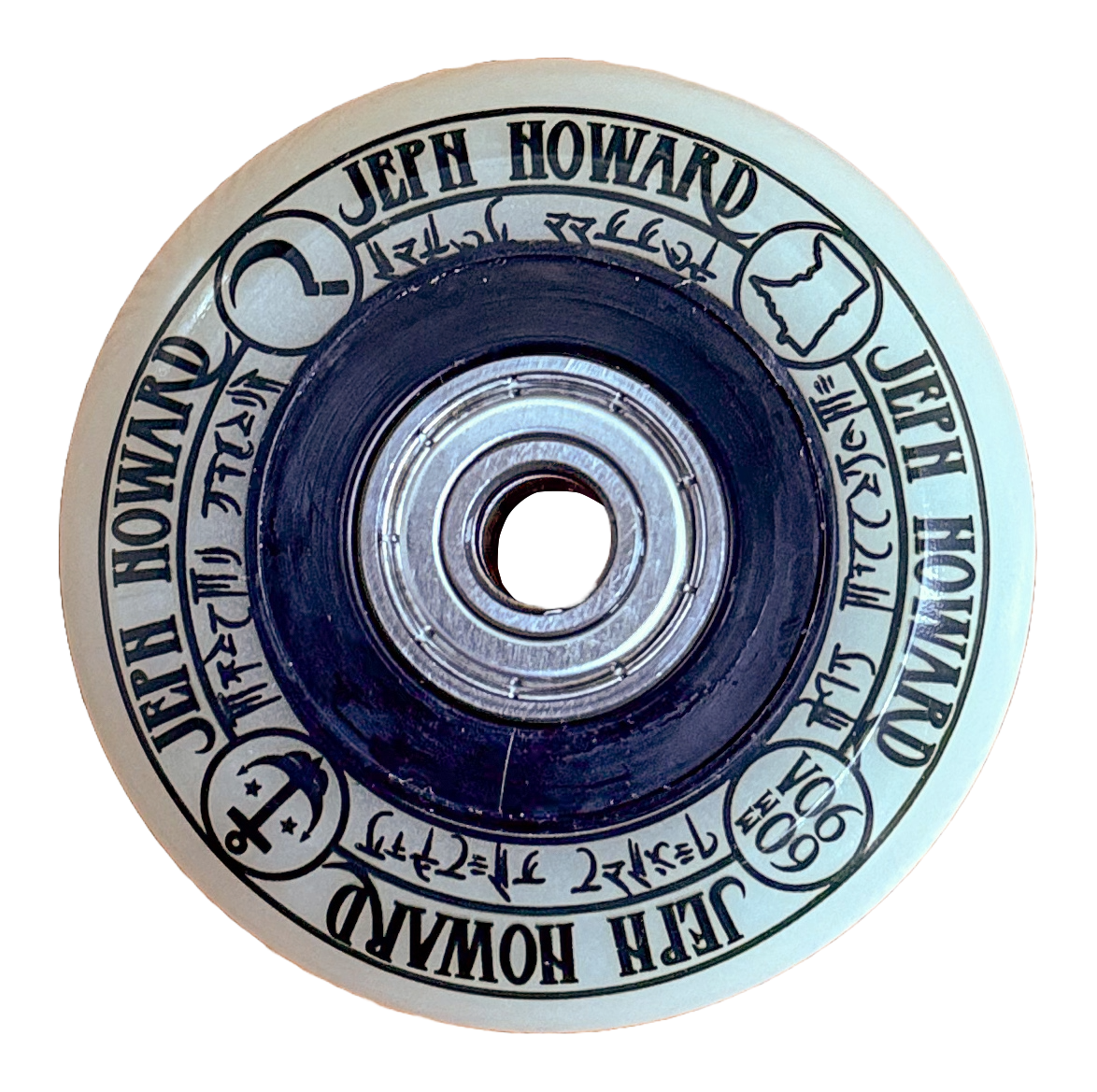
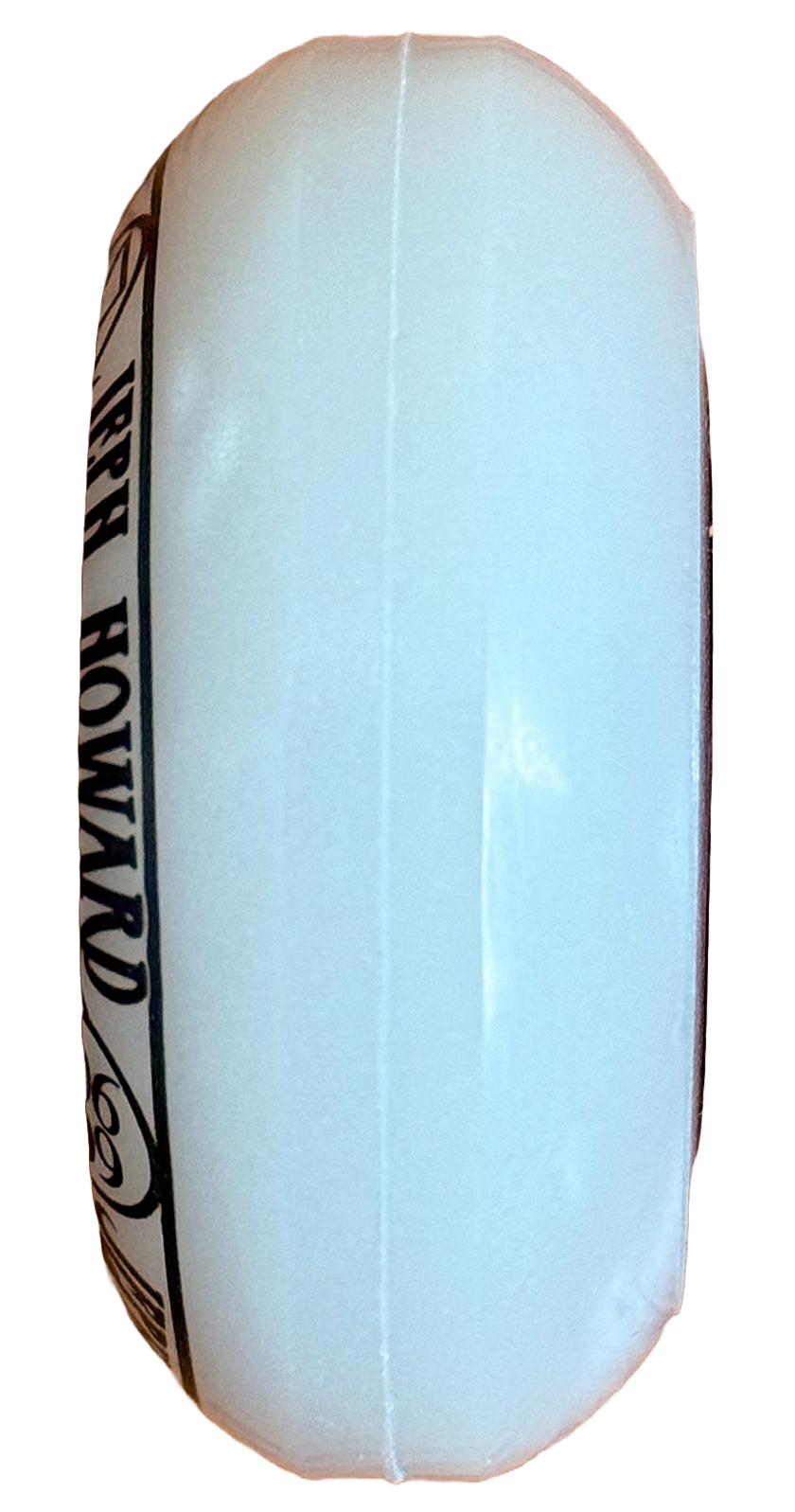
Flatish profile (60 mm)

Some inline wheels feature a flat contact profile, resembling car tires with a rounded rectangular shape. This shape provides a stable upright rolling experience with a strong grip on the ground, due to the larger surface area. Flat-profile wheels work well for disciplines that keep skates upright while rolling, such as aggressive skating. Typical aggressive wheels are relatively small, ranging from 55 mm to 64 mm in diameter. Grindwheels, installed as middle wheels, are even smaller, typically under 50 mm. Made from hard polyurethane or plastic, they have reduced traction to minimize wheel bite during a grind. However, where grip is needed, such as during stair bashing, the flat profile’s large contact surface helps compensate for the grindwheels' inherently low traction. In the 1990s, aggressive wheels and grindwheels trended toward completely flat profiles. However, in the 2020s and beyond, aggressive skaters began favoring wheels with slightly rounder profiles, offering a balance between stability and maneuverability.

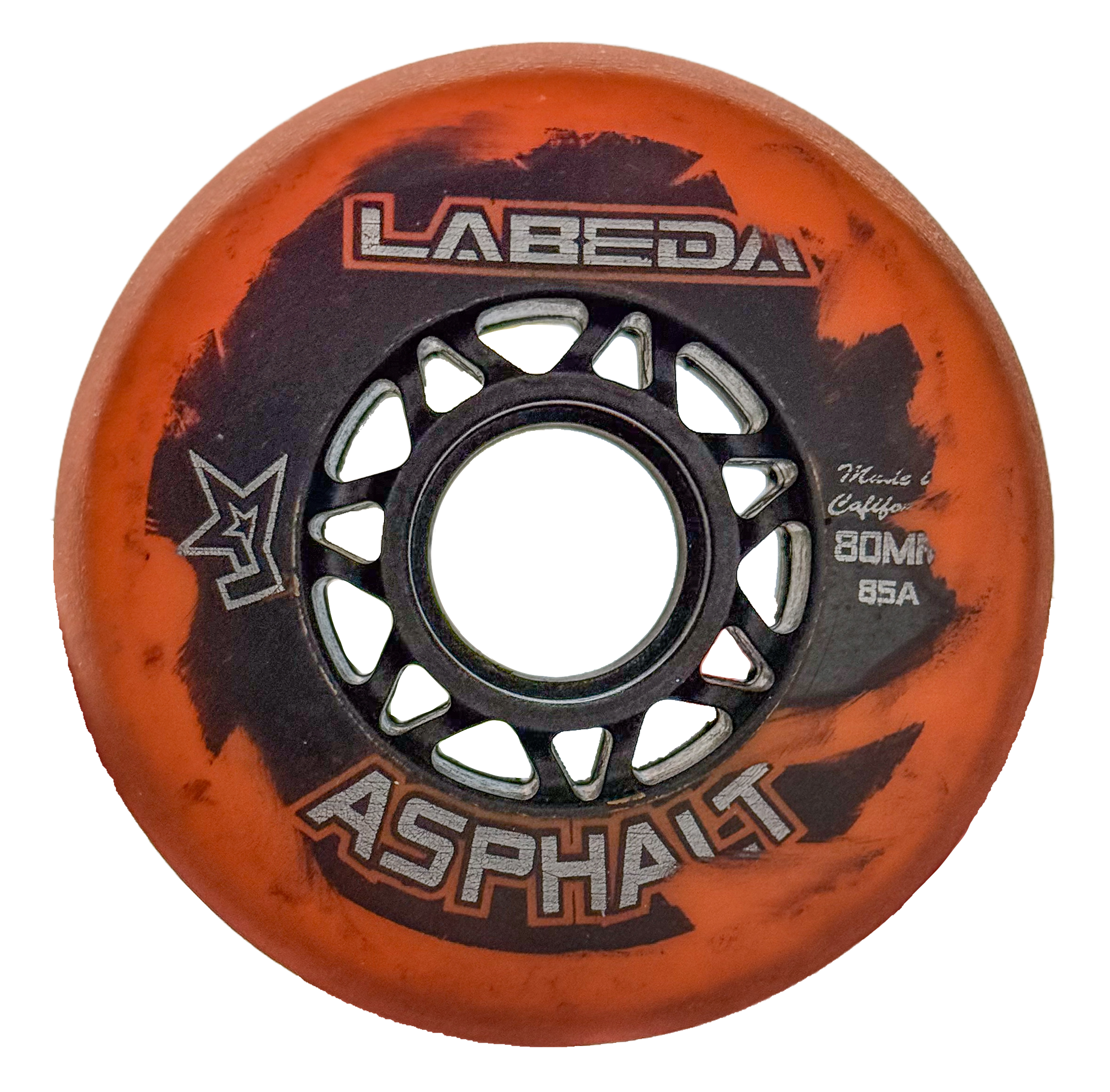
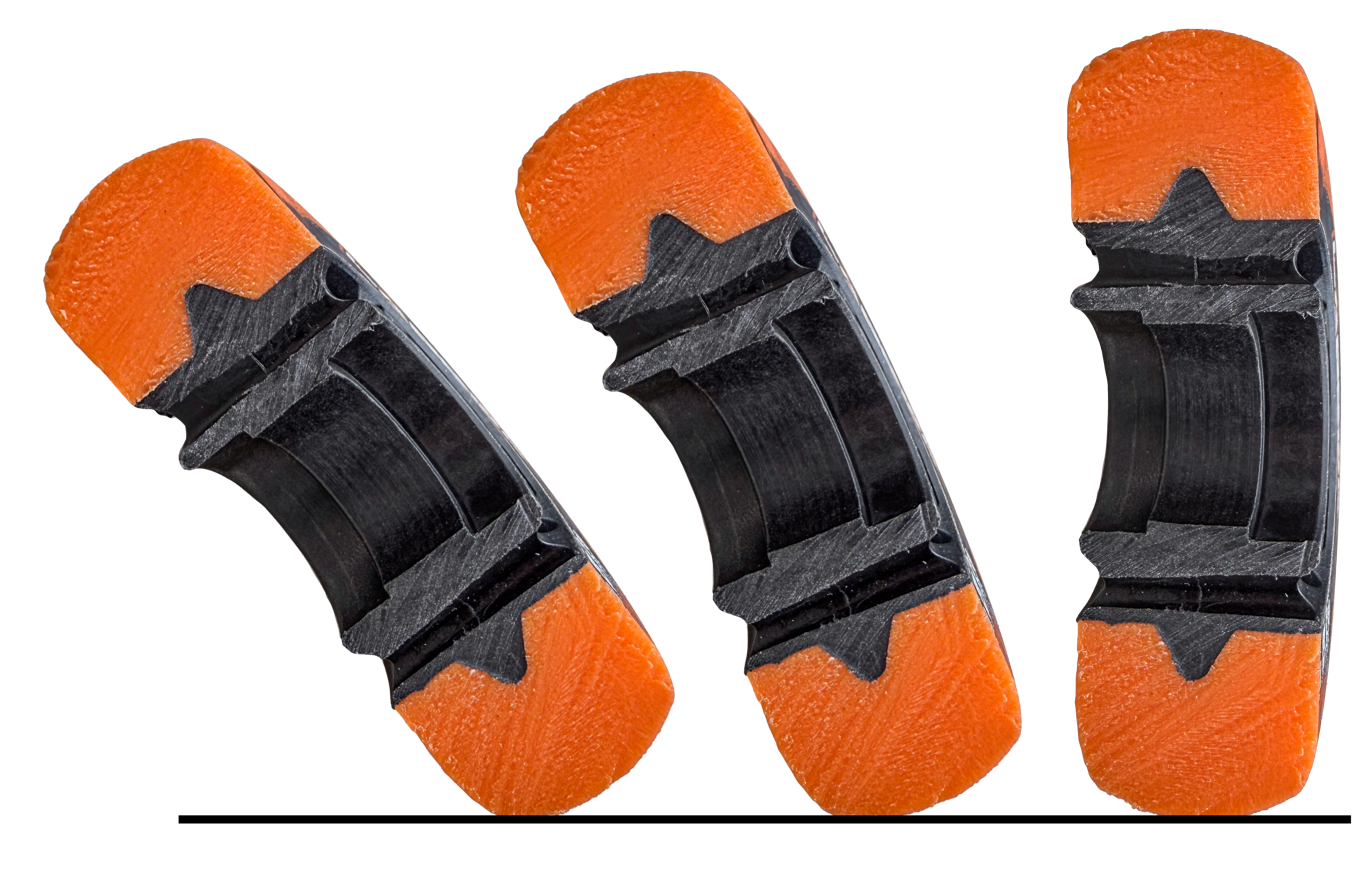
Round profile (80 mm) and 3 edging angles

Most inline wheels have a round profile rather than a flat one. This is because skaters don't always roll with their skates perfectly upright. Much like ice skating with blades, many inline skating techniques involve edging - that is, skating on the side of the wheels. This requires the skate to tilt at various angles, depending on the move being performed. (Note: Inline skating adopts the terms "outside edge" and "inside edge" from ice skating, even though inline wheels lack the sharp dual edges of ice blades. The outside edge refers to the side of the wheel facing away from the skater's body, while the inside edge is the side facing inward.) A round profile maintains a consistent, usable contact surface across different edging angles, even if that surface is smaller than what a flat-profile wheel provides when fully upright. Disciplines like inline hockey and freestyle slalom typically favor round-profile wheels of smallish to medium size, with diameters no larger than 80 mm.

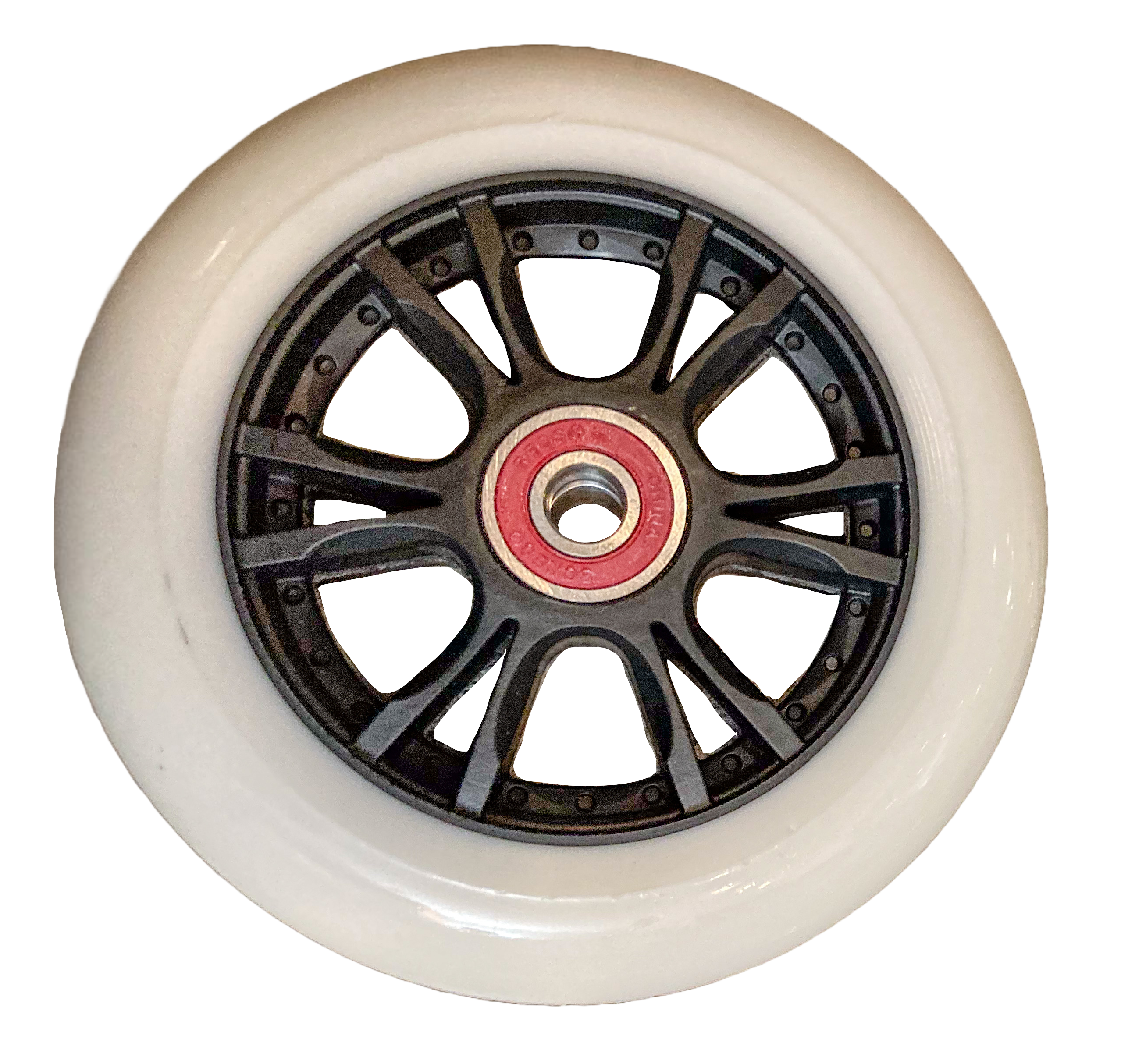
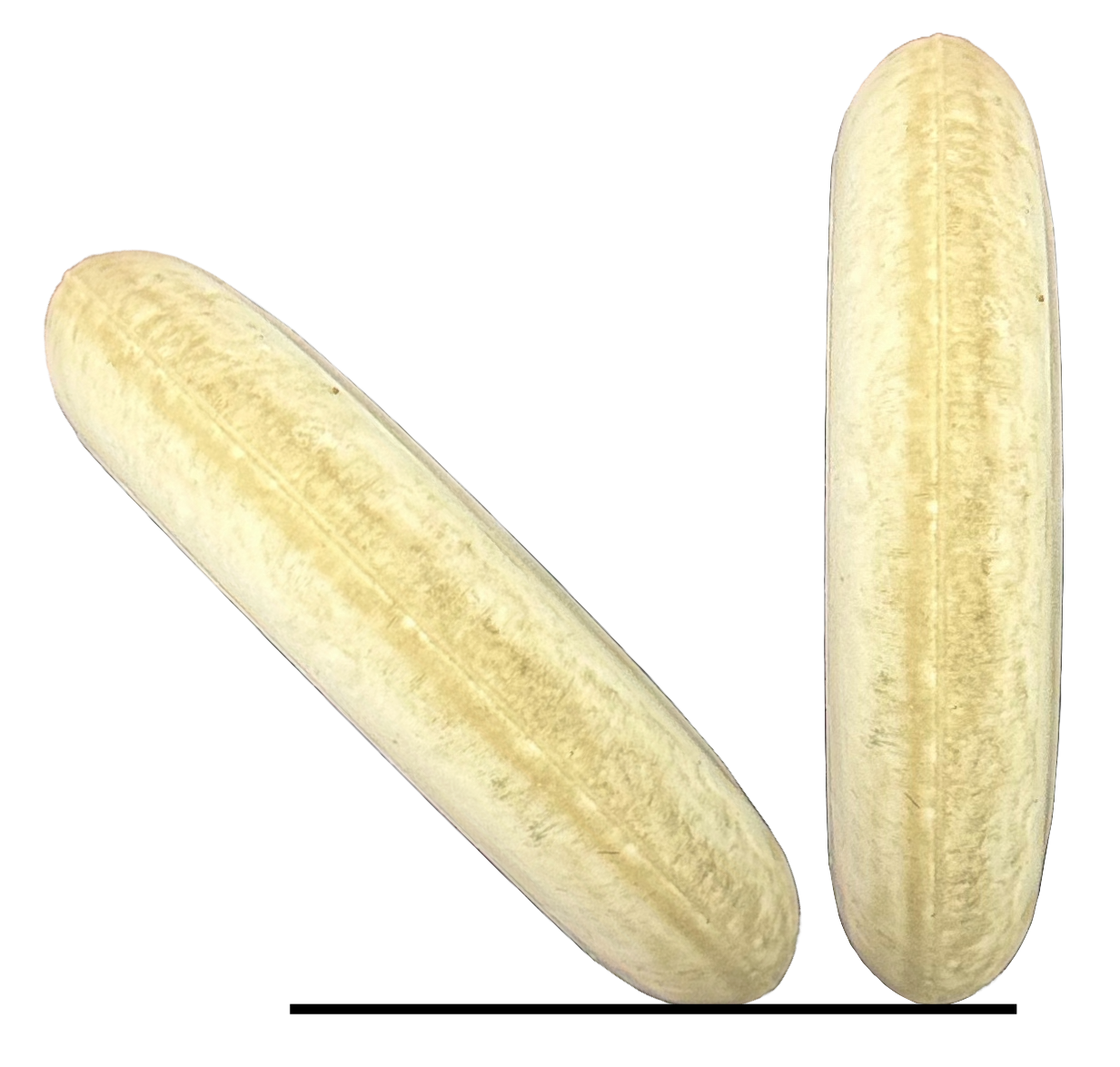
Bullet profile (110 mm) and striding vs gliding

At the opposite end of the spectrum from the flat profile is the bullet profile, also known as the pointy, thin, narrow, or elliptical profile. This shape is usually found in larger wheels ranging from 90 mm to 125 mm in diameter. The combination of a bullet profile and large diameter serves the unique demands of speed skating, where racers aim to satisfy two seemingly conflicting goals.

The first goal is to maximize static friction between wheel and ground during the stride phase with a deep edging angle, converting as much energy as possible from a lateral push-off into forward kinetic motion. The bullet profile supports this by offering a generous contact surface when the skate is deeply tilted, effectively extending the power phase of the stride, covering a large striding distance. The second goal is to minimize rolling friction, more appropriately called rolling resistance, during the glide phase. When the skate returns to an upright position, the bullet profile offers a small point of contact with the ground, reducing rolling resistance and enabling longer, faster glides with minimal energy loss.

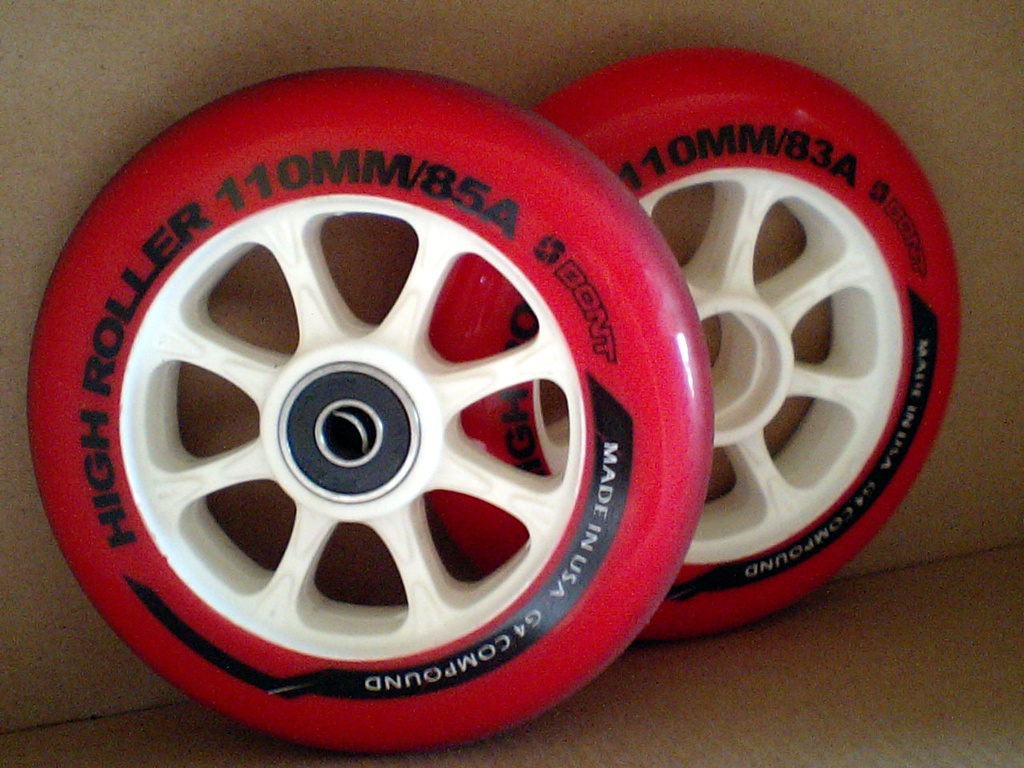
Large 110 mm racing wheels

In addition, large wheels function like flywheels, storing substantial rotational energy, which helps the racer reach and maintain high speeds over long distances. The gyroscopic effect of these large spinning wheels further enhances efficiency by stabilizing the skate’s direction, promoting straight-line tracking and reducing energy lost to unwanted lateral drift. However, this benefit comes with a trade-off: larger wheels have greater mass, which makes them harder and slower to accelerate.

In contrast, small wheels are easier to accelerate due to their lower rotational inertia, enabling faster starts and quicker maneuvers. They also lower a skater's center of gravity, improving control and stability. However, smaller wheels can result in a bumpier ride, as they struggle more over obstacles like bumps, cracks, sticks, and pebbles.

== Hardness and deformation ==
Wheels deform under the weight of the skater

Polyurethane wheels deform elastically under the weight of the skater, and a certain amount of deformation is desirable because it increases the contact area between the wheel and the ground, enhancing grip. This deformed contact area, often referred to as the footprint in the literature, differs slightly from the profile of an unloaded wheel.

The ideal amount of deformation depends on the skating surface. On smooth, slippery indoor rinks with polished wood floors, softer wheels are preferred, as their greater deformation allows them to mold to the surface and improve traction. In contrast, outdoor roads with asphalt surfaces call for harder wheels that deform less, since the naturally rough texture of the ground already provides sufficient grip with minimal footprint.

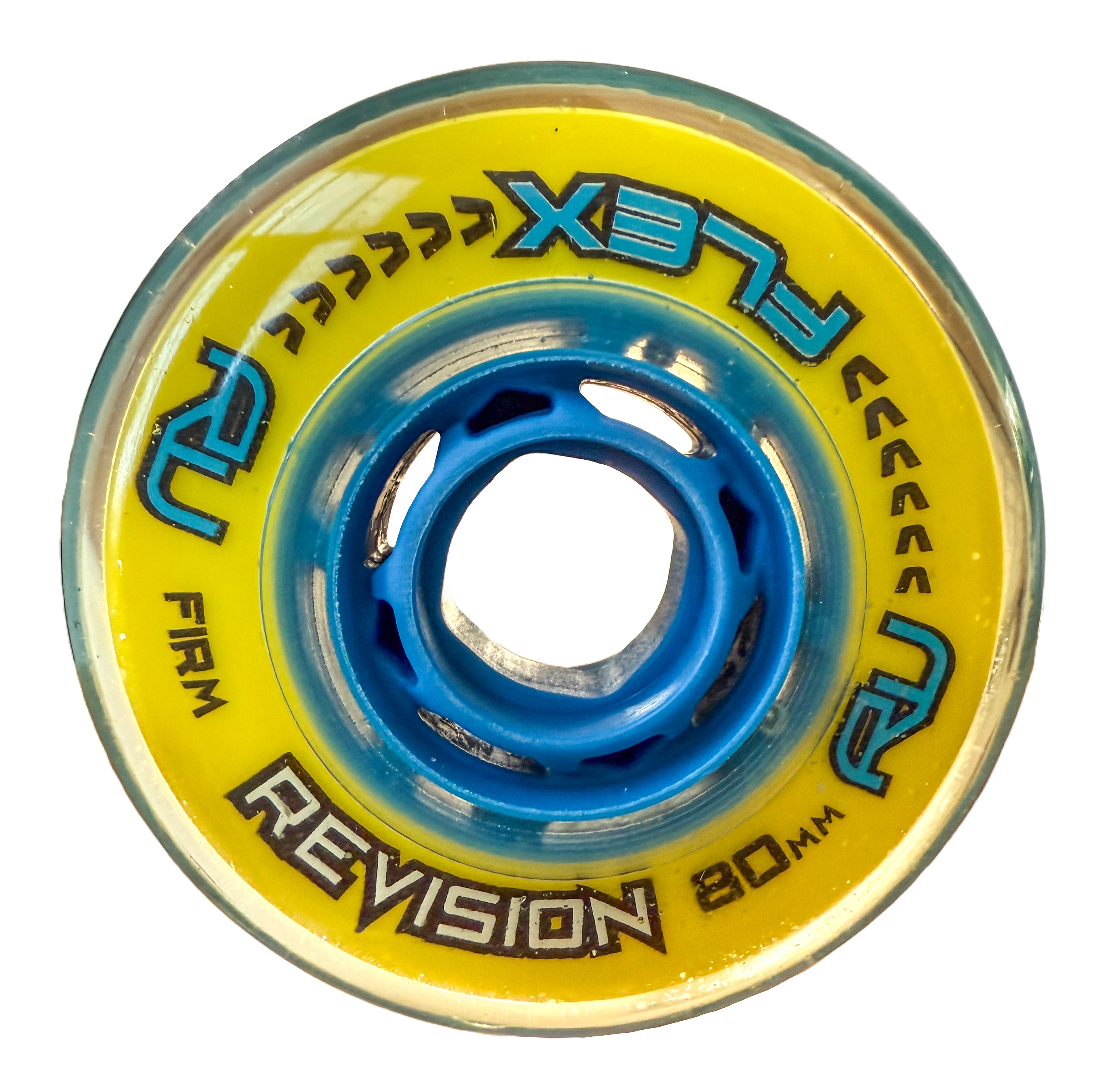
76A indoor

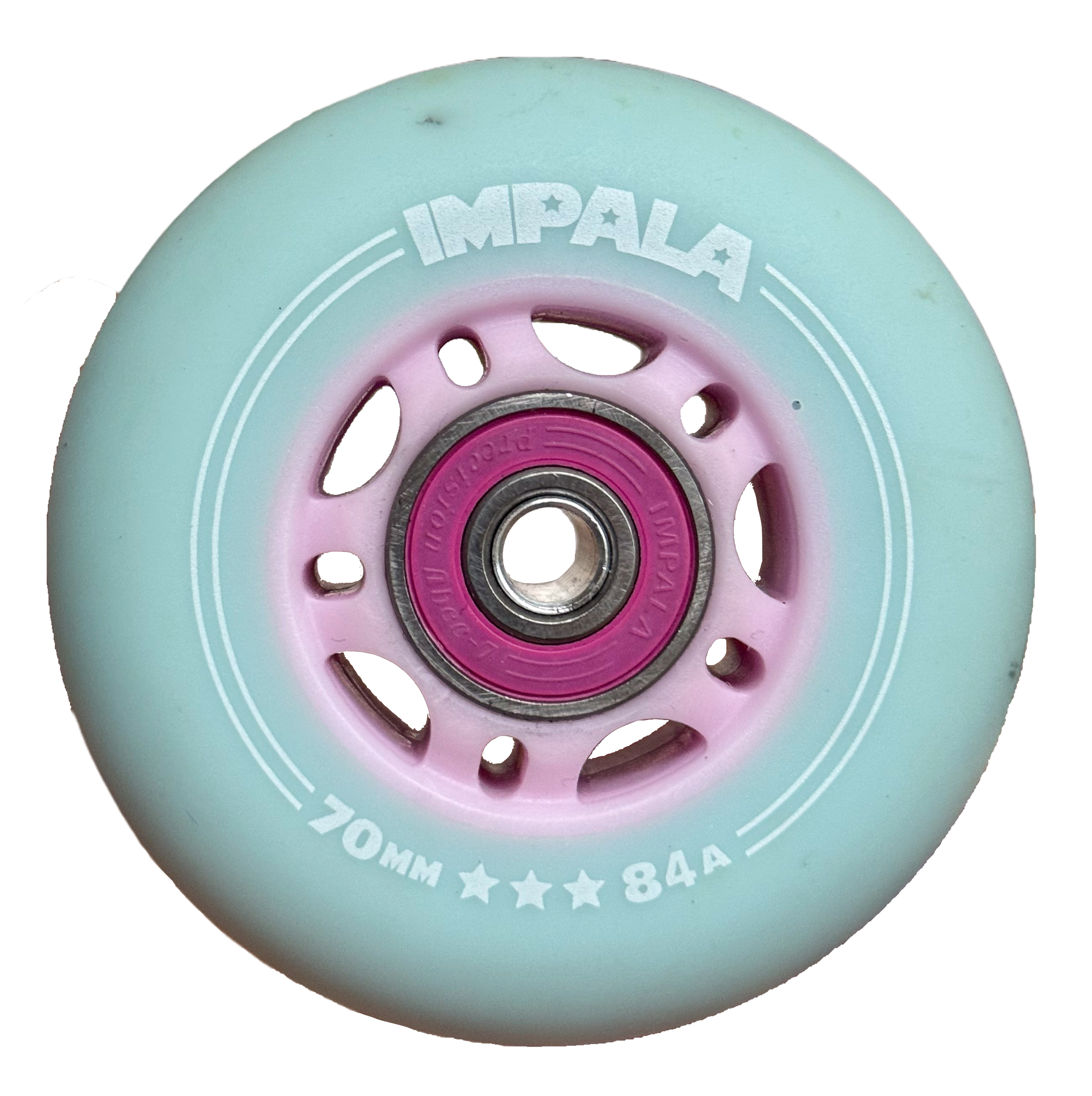
84A outdoor

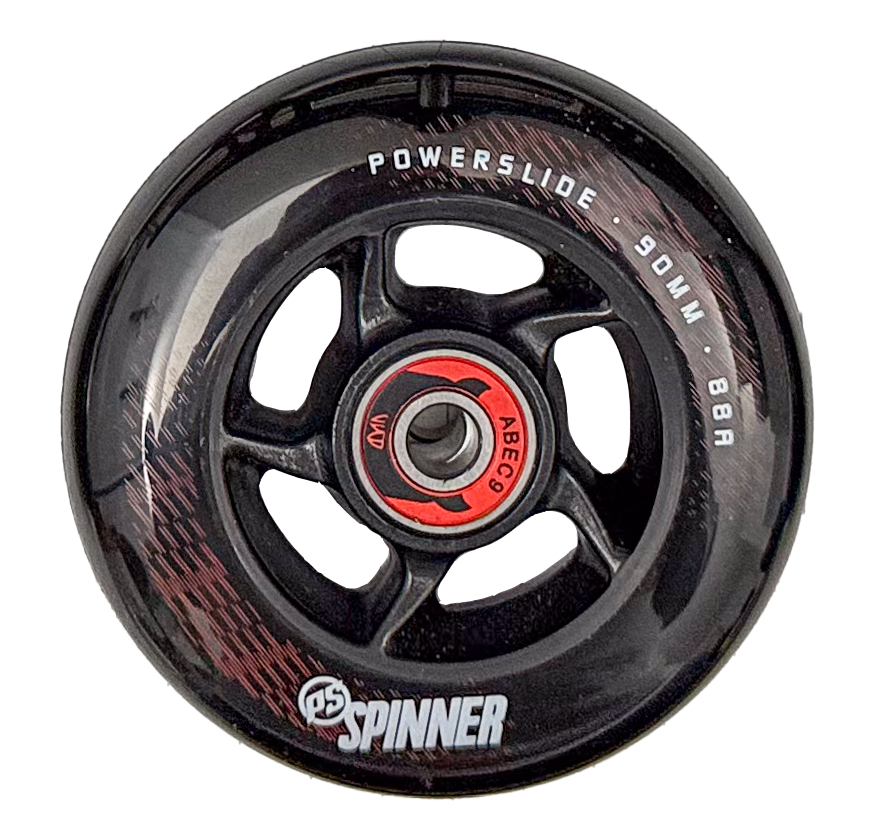
88A urban

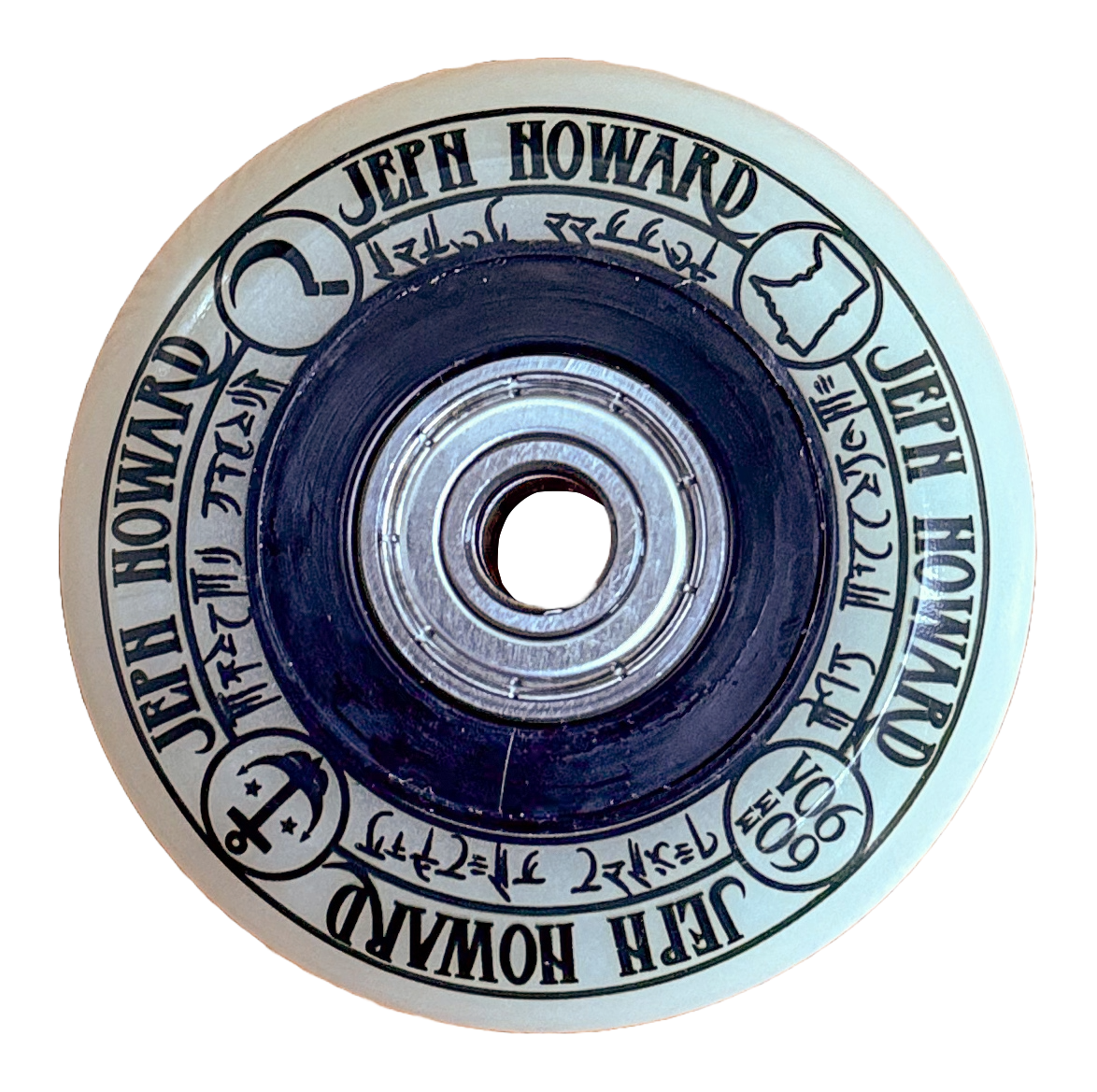
90A aggro

Achieving the right balance of grip is crucial. Too little grip can cause the skater to slip during the stride phase, wasting energy without translating it into forward motion. On the other hand, too much grip creates excessive rolling resistance, which quickly saps speed during the glide phase.

In general, softer wheels generate more rolling resistance due to their greater deformation, while harder wheels require less effort to start rolling and maintain speed on smooth surfaces. However, rolling resistance is also influenced by the roughness of the terrain. When a hard wheel rolls over a bumpy surface, energy is wasted as it repeatedly lifts the skater’s weight over each small surface imperfection, offsetting some of the advantages typically associated with hard wheels, such as quick acceleration and higher sustained speed. In contrast, the smoother ride provided by softer wheels can help absorb these irregularities, reducing energy loss and partially compensating for the speed sacrificed to deformation.

The actual degree of wheel deformation is influenced by three main factors: the skater's weight, the wheel's intrinsic hardness, and its current temperature. A skater’s weight remains relatively constant, and wheel hardness is fixed at the time of manufacture. However, wheel temperature varies; it is influenced by ambient conditions, heat absorbed from rolling over warm surfaces, and heat generated by the bearings during prolonged high-speed skating. As wheel temperature rises, the polyurethane softens and deforms more easily, temporarily reducing the wheel’s effective hardness.

Wheel hardness is measured using the Shore durometer type A scale, which is designed for relatively soft materials. The scale ranges from 0A (the softest) to 100A (the hardest). Inline skate wheels typically fall between 72A and 95A, depending on their intended use. Indoor hockey wheels are among the softest, usually rated between 72A and 78A. Outdoor wheels for recreation use slightly harder compounds, typically ranging from 80A to 84A. Freestyle slalom and urban skating wheels fall in the medium-hard range, from 83A to 88A. At the upper end, aggressive skating wheels are some of the hardest, rated between 88A and 95A.

Within the suitable hardness range for a given activity, skaters would choose wheels at the softer end to benefit from improved grip, which allows for quicker acceleration during lateral strides. Softer wheels also offer a more comfortable ride on uneven surfaces, as their greater deformation helps absorb vibrations and reduces energy loss. But this comes at the cost of faster wear.

Conversely, wheels at the harder end of the range enable skaters to reach and maintain higher top speeds during gliding. Harder wheels are more resistant to wear on rough surfaces and provide a more direct, responsive feel. But this can result in a bumpier ride and some loss of energy.

== Dual density ==
For nearly two decades after polyurethane wheels became standard on modern inline skates, skaters faced a difficult compromise: selecting a single wheel hardness to balance two conflicting sets of needs. On one hand, softer wheels were desirable for shock absorption over rough terrain and for maintaining grip at deep edging angles. On the other hand, harder wheels offered better wear resistance on abrasive surfaces and allowed for higher top speeds while gliding upright. Skaters had to weigh these trade-offs carefully, as no single hardness could perfectly satisfy both demands.

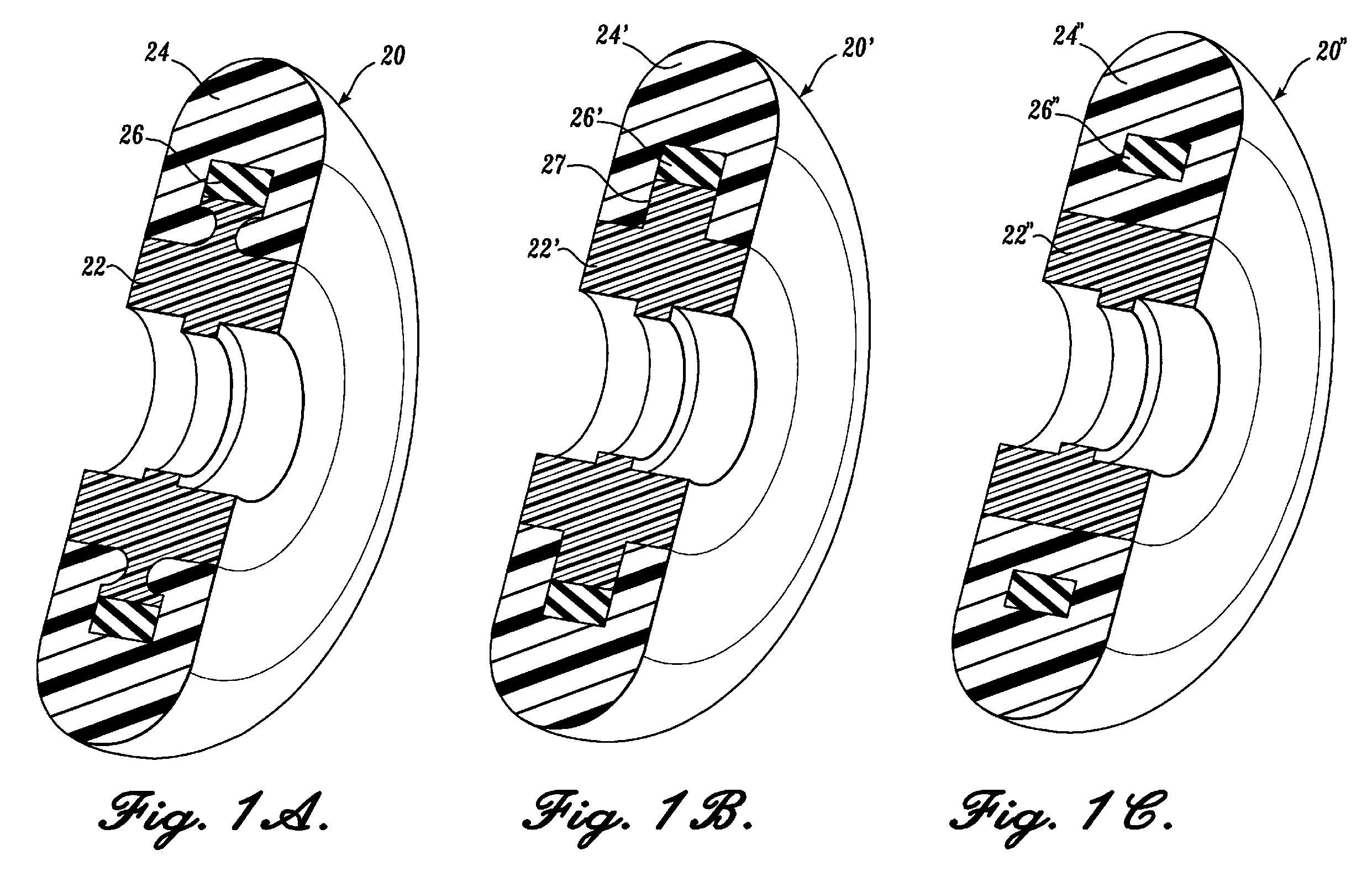
Dual durometer wheel

In 1997, K2 filed a patent for what it called a dual durometer wheel - later known in the industry as a dual density wheel - designed to offer the comfort of a smooth ride over rough terrain without sacrificing the key advantages of hard wheels: wear resistance and high top speed. Unlike conventional wheels made from a single polyurethane compound, this design featured two layers: a hard outer tire, typically rated between 70A and 100A, and a soft inner ring, rated between 20A and 75A. The compressible inner ring absorbed shocks and vibrations, while the hard outer layer maintained durability and top speed.

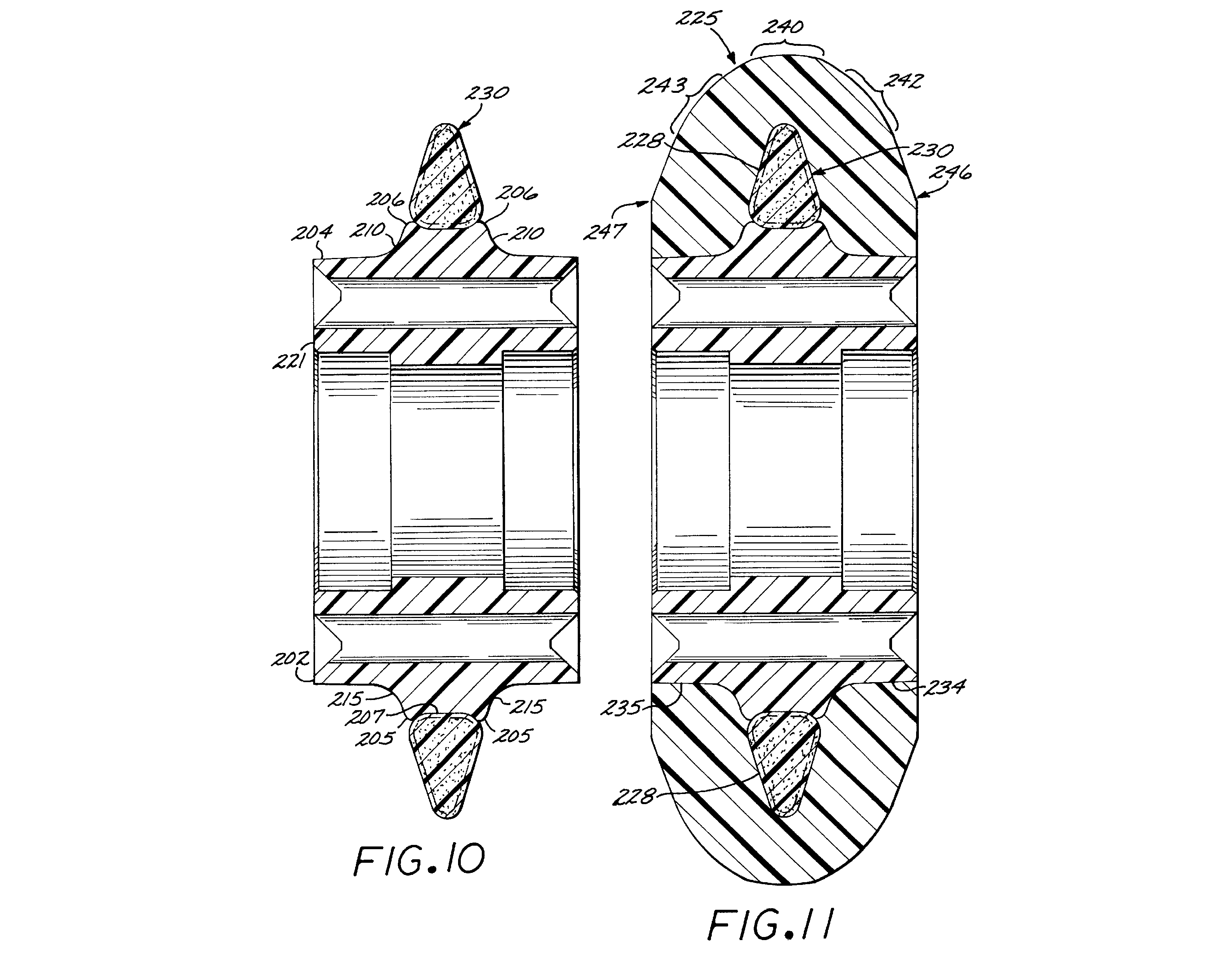
Foam mandrel

That same year, Neal Piper and Tom Peterson of Hyper Wheels filed a patent for a similar concept, but with a key difference: instead of using a soft polyurethane ring, their design featured an inner foam mandrel with a triangular cross-section. This approach aimed not only to deliver the same advantages offered by K2’s dual-durometer wheels, but also to enhance grip during deep edging. The foam mandrel was encased in an airtight skin, which shaped load-bearing side walls in the hard outer tire. The triangular foam shape preserved the tip of the wheel profile from deforming when skating upright, while allowing the sides of the profile to deform under the angled loads of striding and turning at around a 30° tilt, improving grip during these maneuvers.

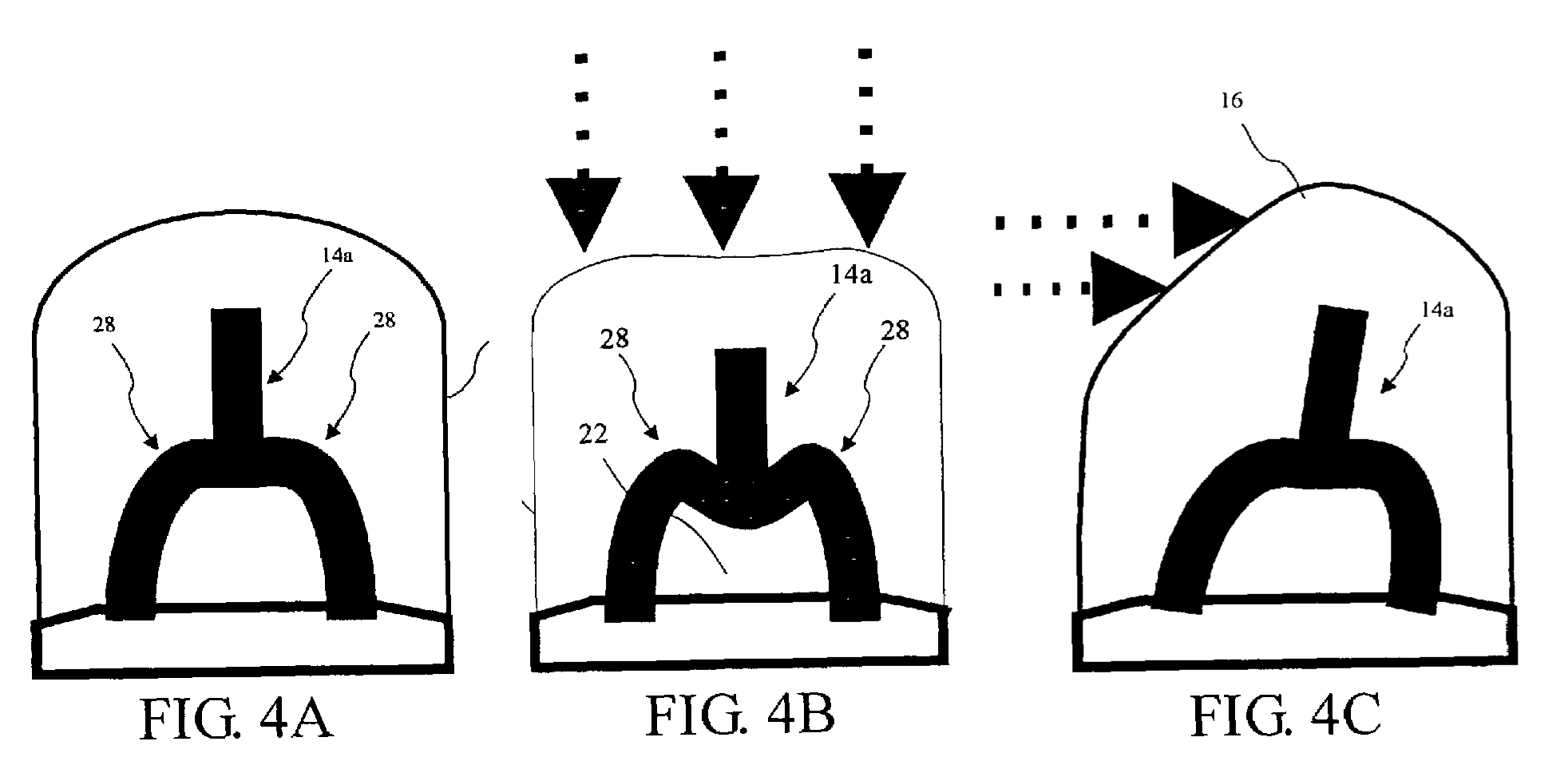
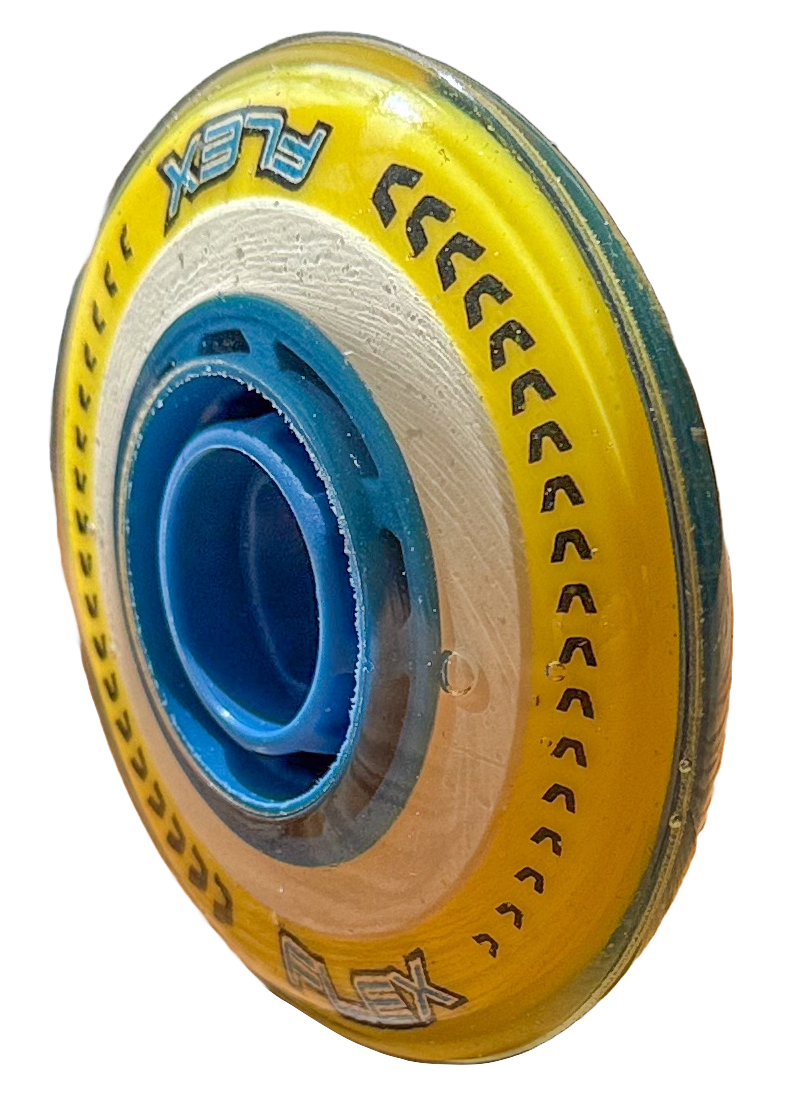
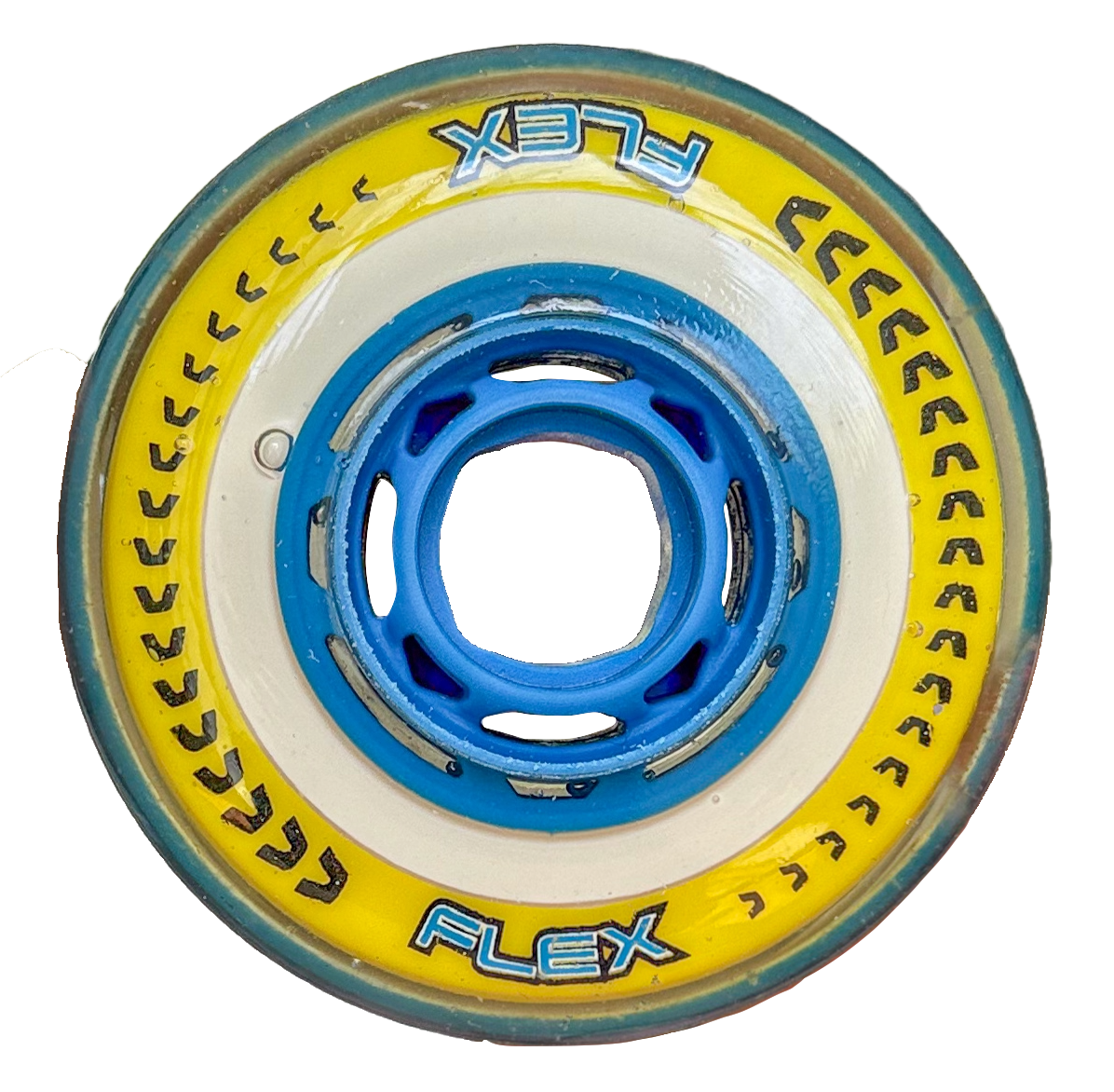
Soft tire molded over harder support: Revision Flex

In 2004, Neal Piper, widely regarded as one of the most influential skate wheel chemists, filed a patent for a multi-density wheel that approached the same problem from the opposite direction of his earlier 1997 Hyper Wheels design. Instead of using a hard outer layer with a soft inner ring, this new design featured a soft polyurethane outer layer, typically rated between 60A and 75A, molded over an internal support structure made from much harder materials, usually rated between 80A and 95A or even higher. The concept first materialized as the Variant hockey wheels from Revision, and later evolved into the Recoil and Flex product lines. These wheels allowed hockey players to achieve top speed without sacrificing high grip.

== Rebound ==
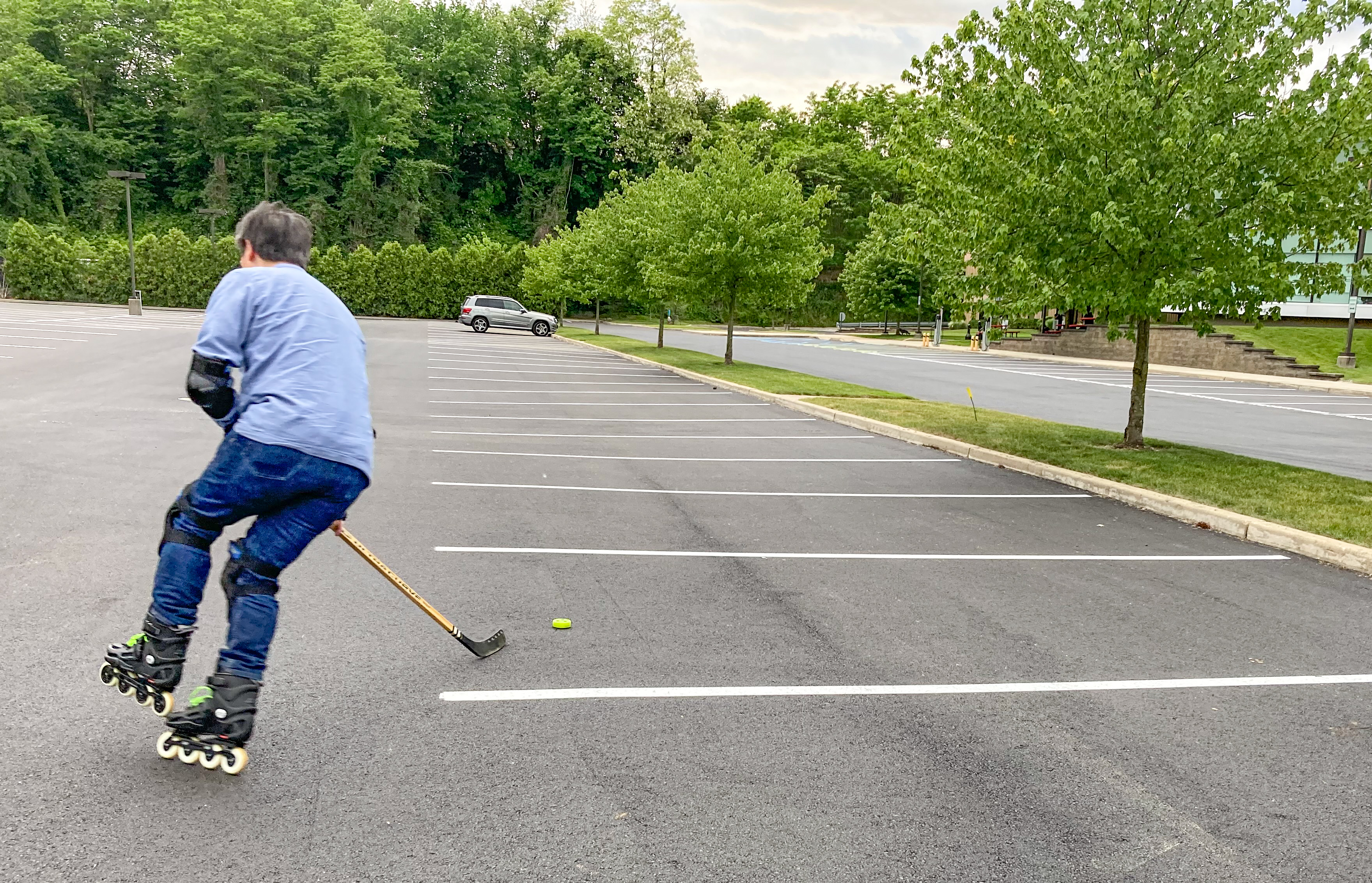
Rebound improves cornering

Wheel rebound refers to the amount of energy a polyurethane wheel returns as it recovers its shape after being elastically deformed by weight or force. While the term is commonly used, there is no consensus on how to consistently measure and publish rebound ratings. However, the relative rebound of different wheels can be easily compared by dropping them from the same height and observing how high each one bounces back from the floor.

Rebound is a universally-desirable trait, unlike other wheel characteristics that must be chosen to suit a skater’s style, terrain, and preferences. Across all disciplines and surfaces, the higher the rebound, the better. Such is not true of diameter, profile, or hardness. If cost were no concern, skaters would always choose the wheels with the highest rebound.

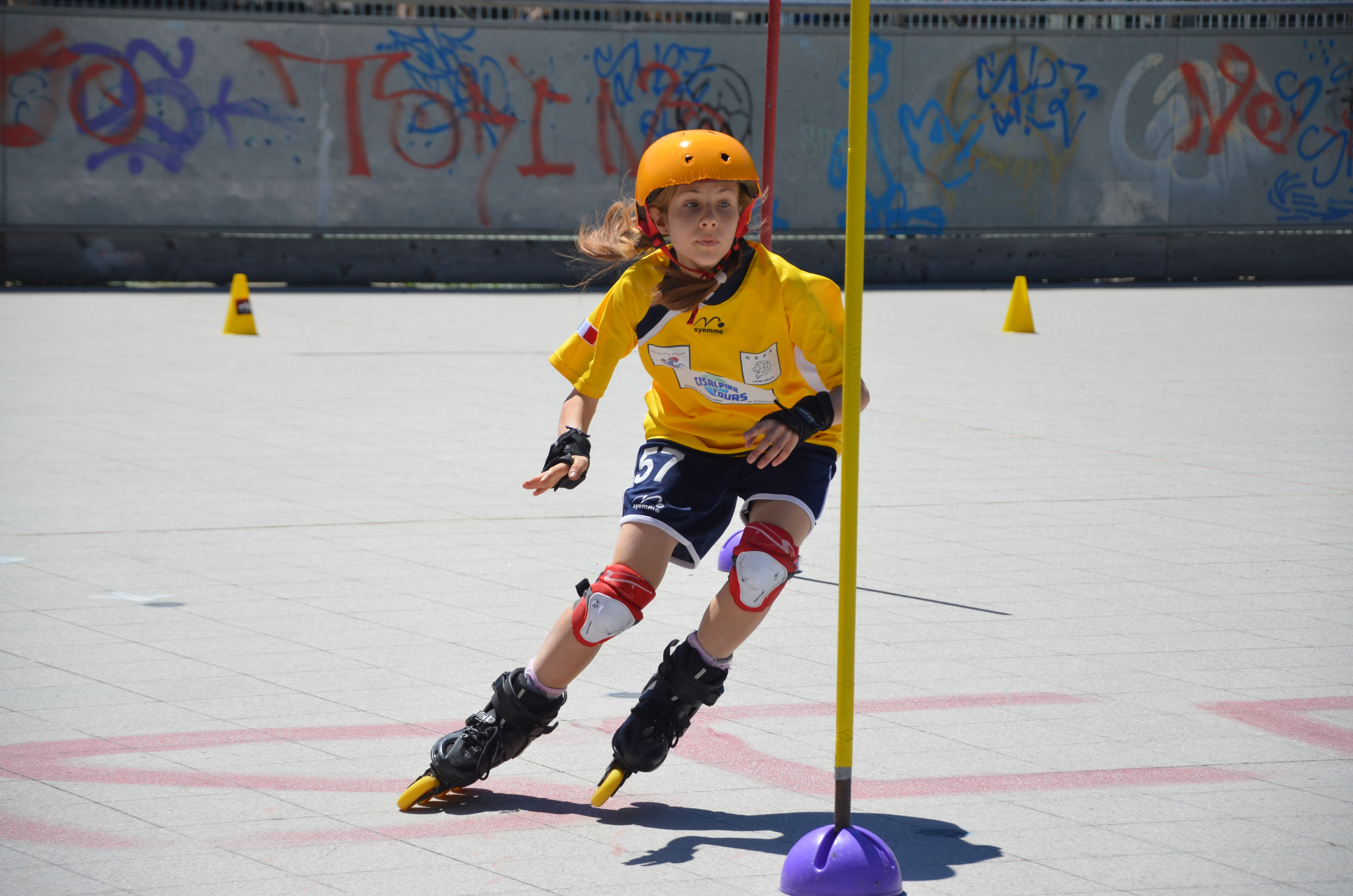
High rebound wheels feel lively and responsive

A high-rebound wheel feels lively, snappy, and responsive, while a low-rebound wheel feels dead. Skaters on high-rebound wheels roll faster and with less effort, as more of the energy generated by each push against the ground is returned by the wheels and converted into forward motion. In contrast, low-rebound wheels behave more like flat tires; they absorb energy rather than returning it, forcing the skater to work harder to maintain speed, much like walking on soft sand.

A polyurethane compound can be formulated to exhibit a wide range of rebound characteristics, independent of its hardness. These are distinct properties of a polyurethane wheel. Hardness determines how much the wheel deforms under load, such as the compression caused by a skater’s weight. Rebound refers to how much of that deformation energy is returned to help propel the skater forward.

Elastic hysteresis graph: energy dissipated and not returned by rebound shown as center area

Rebound can be measured in several ways, including the Bayshore Resilience test and the Rebound Resilience test. The former calculates the ratio of rebound height to drop height, while the latter measures the percentage of energy returned after an impact. When applied to polyurethane, these tests are often described collectively as measuring polyurethane resilience, an industry term synonymous with rebound. Although both tests aim to quantify a material’s elasticity, their results are not directly comparable or convertible. In the context of inline skate wheels, rebound is rarely specified in technical datasheets. When it is, it’s typically presented using vague, consumer-friendly labels such as High Rebound (HR), Super High Rebound (SHR), or Ultra High Rebound (UHR).

In mechanics, rebound is often characterized by its complementary property, elastic hysteresis. Rebound refers to the amount of energy a wheel returns after deformation. On the other hand, elastic hysteresis measures the amount of energy lost, typically as heat, during the deformation and recovery cycle. These two properties are inversely proportional: a wheel with high elastic hysteresis dissipates more energy as heat when compressed and released, resulting in lower rebound.

== Rolling resistance ==
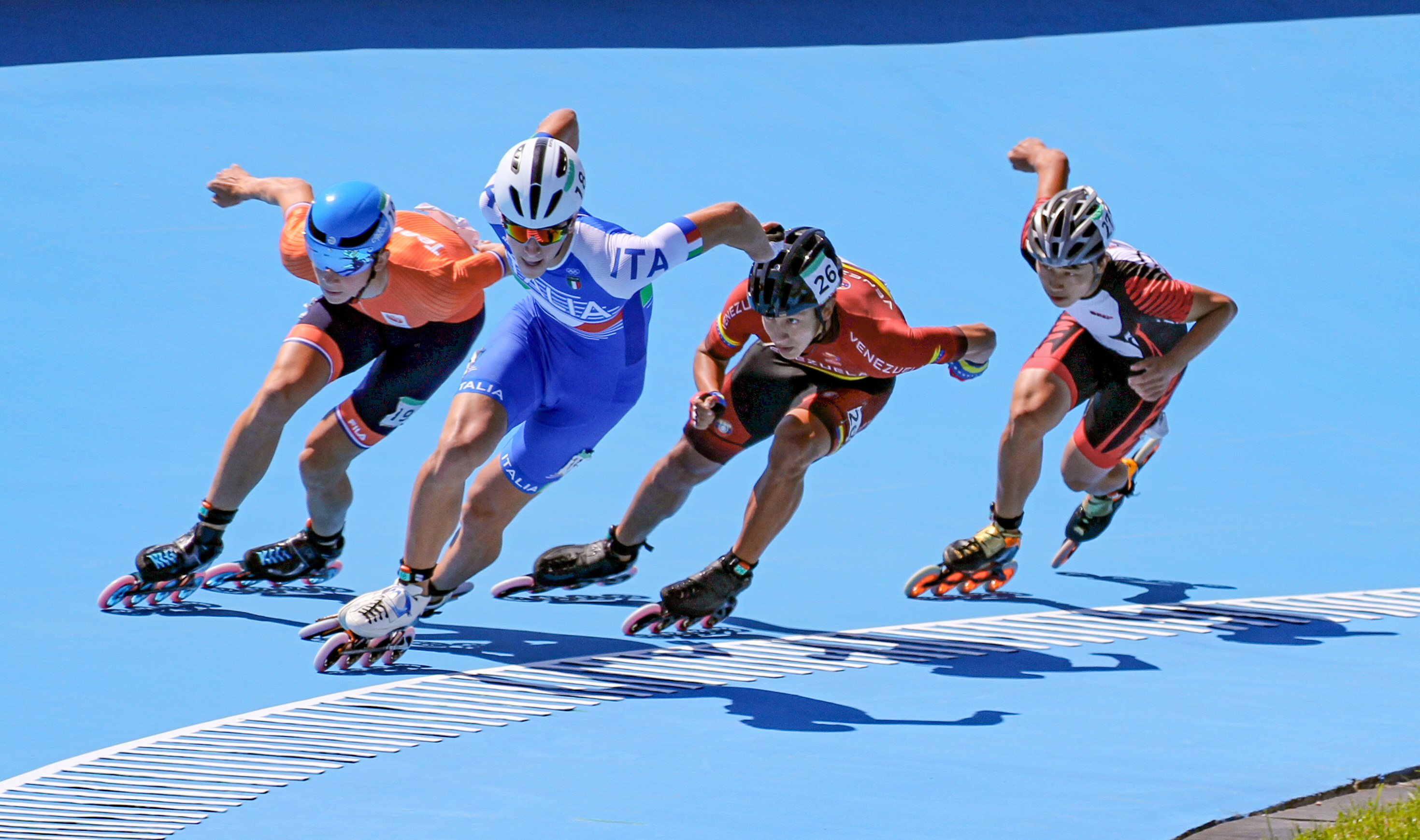
Gliding with minimum rolling resistance

Rolling resistance is often the main factor limiting a skater’s ability to reach top speed. Also known as rolling friction or rolling drag, it refers to the force that opposes the rolling motion of the wheels as the skater glides across a surface.

Several factors influence rolling resistance, but the most significant is typically elastic hysteresis. Recognizing its impact, all reputable wheel manufacturers formulate polyurethane compounds to deliver high rebound and thus low elastic hysteresis. This is particularly crucial in speed skating, where maximizing top speed is the primary objective.

Wheel footprints

The weight of the skater and the hardness of the wheel together determine the degree of wheel deformation and the resulting increase in footprint under load. Footprint is another key contributor to rolling resistance. In general, speed skaters favor hard wheels with a pointy profile, which create smaller footprints and therefore minimize rolling resistance when skated upright. The desire to reduce gliding footprint while maintaining comfort led to the development of dual-density wheels.

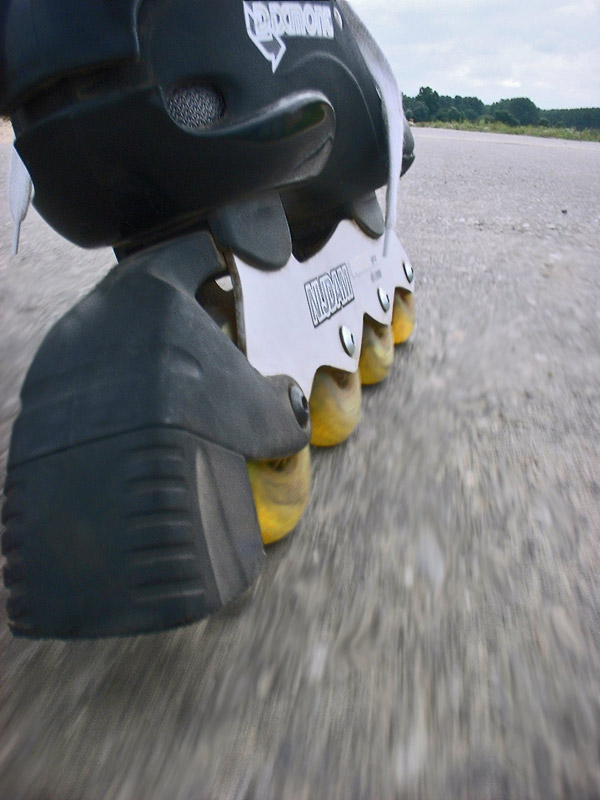
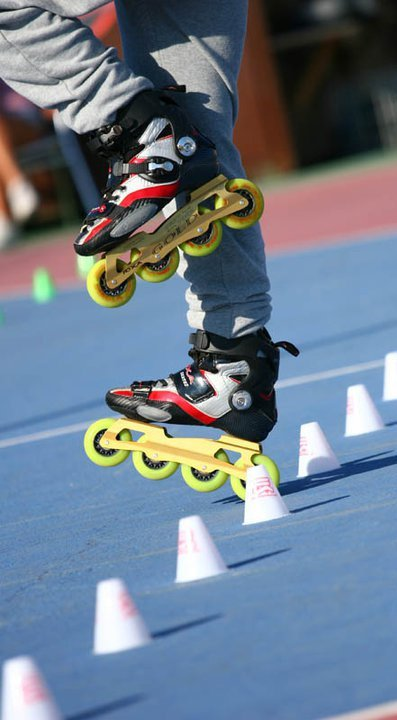
Surfaces: rough vs. smooth

The roughness of the terrain is another key contributor to rolling resistance. As a wheel rolls over a bumpy surface, energy is wasted in repeatedly lifting the skater’s weight over each small imperfection. The need to cushion bumpy rides without increasing the wheel’s footprint under load was another driving force behind the development of dual-density wheels.

Wheel diameter is another important factor in rolling resistance, particularly on rough terrain. In general, larger wheels roll more easily over uneven surfaces. Increasing wheel diameter reduces the coefficient of rolling resistance by decreasing the angle of incidence between the wheel perimeter and surface imperfections. In other words, a larger wheel can bridge bumps and irregularities more smoothly, resulting in less energy loss and easier rolling. This is why relatively large wheels, typically ranging from 90 mm and 125 mm, are commonly used in urban skating and marathon skating, where both speed and the ability to handle imperfect surfaces are essential.
