= Inline skate bearing =

Ball bearings used in inline skate wheels

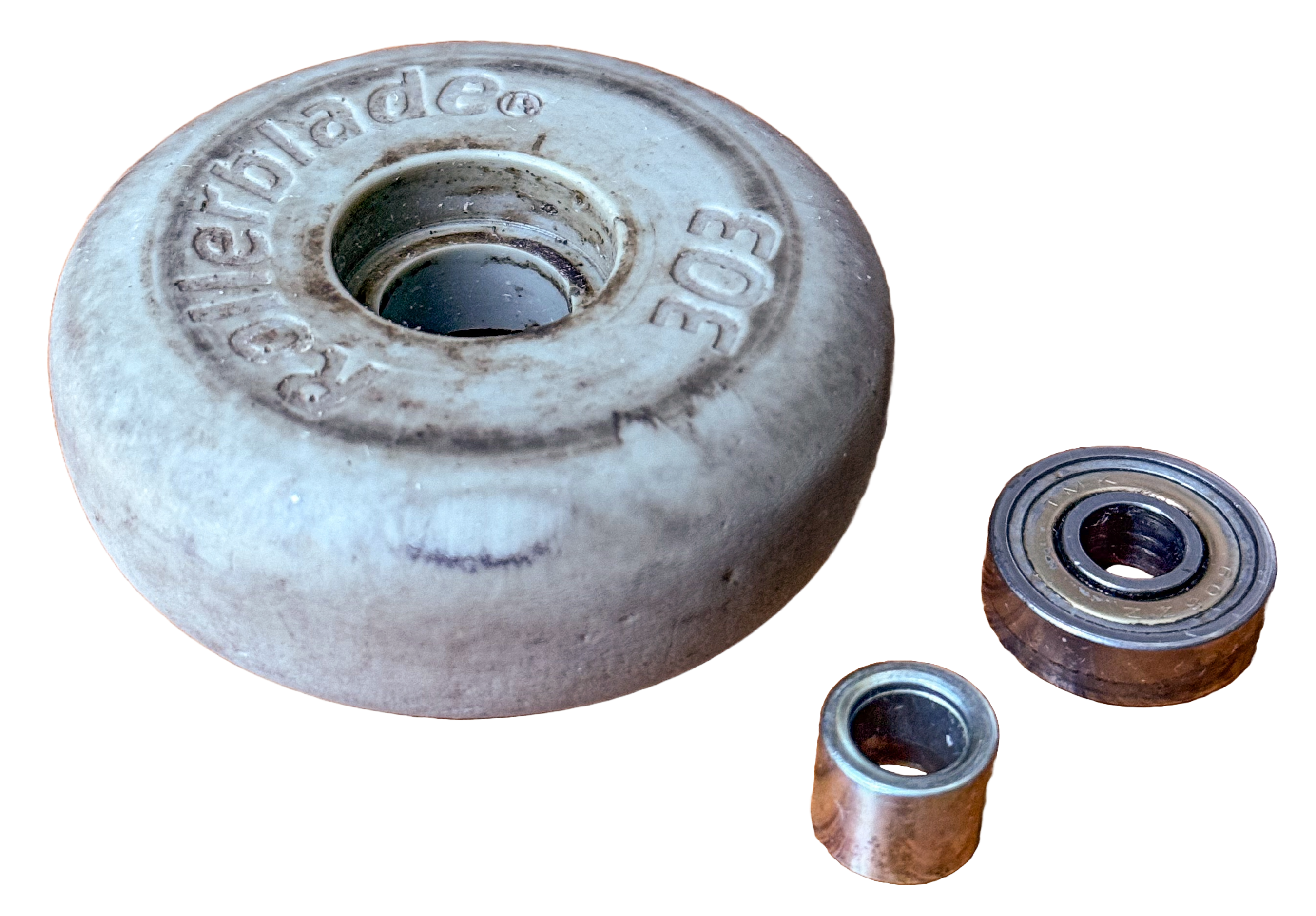
From the 1980s

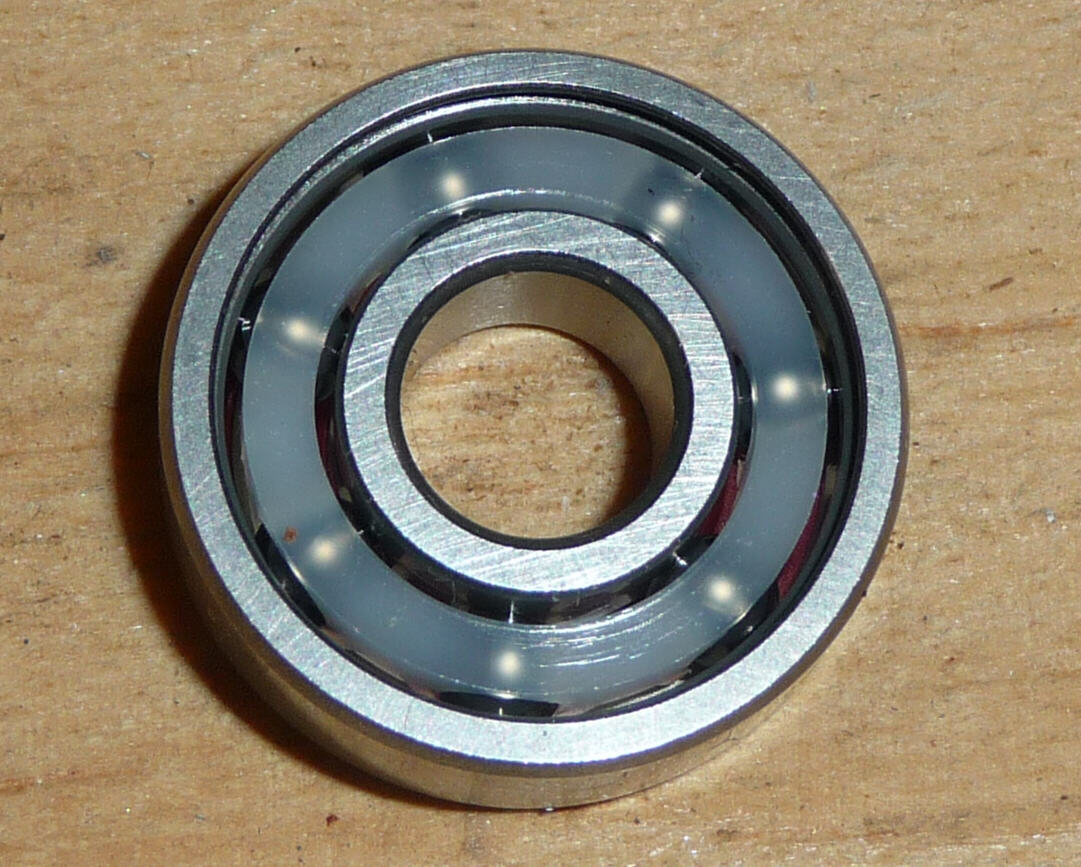
ISO 608 bearing

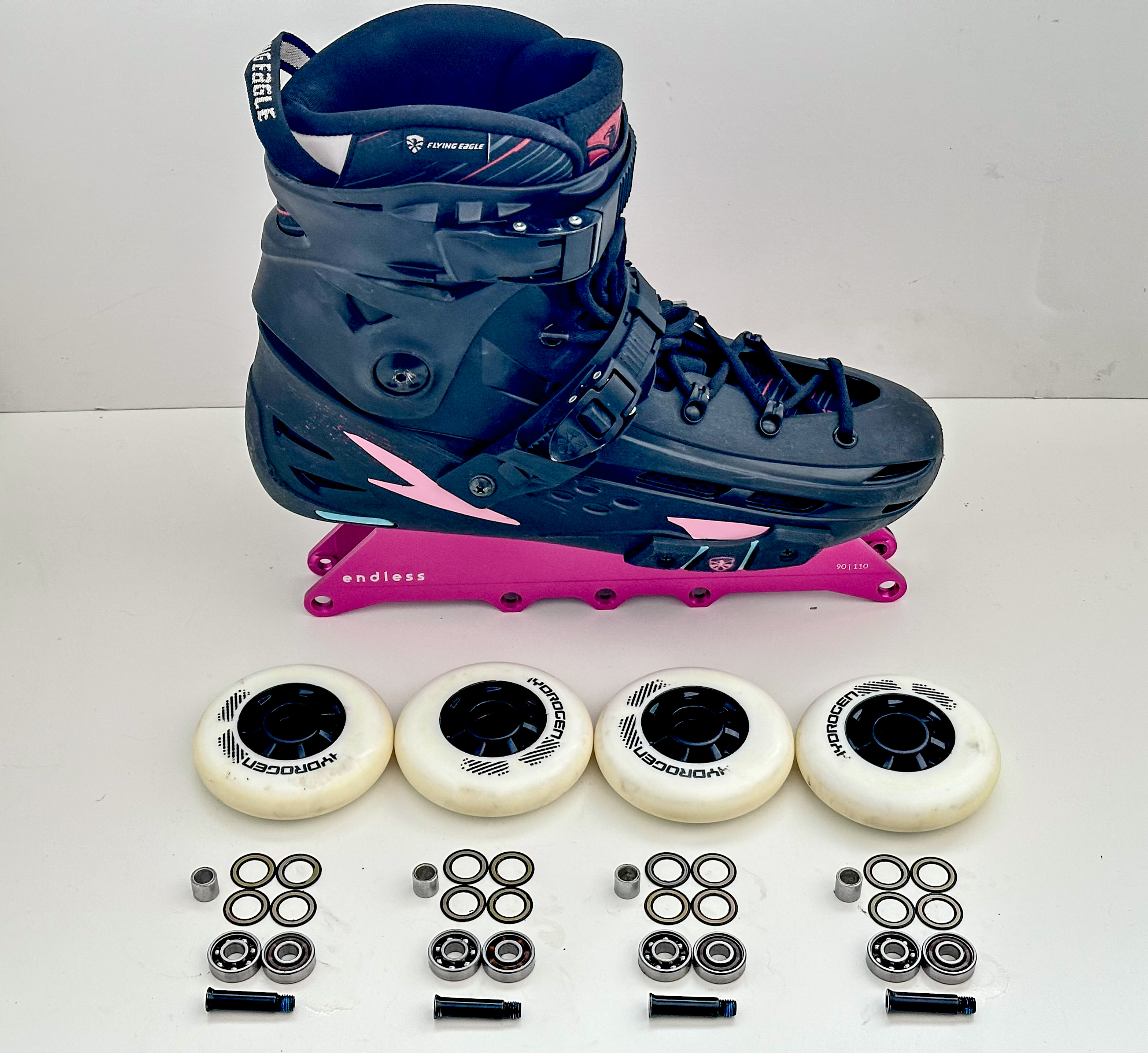
Full set

Ball bearings are used in inline skates to enable inline skate wheels to rotate freely and smoothly. The adoption of modern ISO 608 ball bearings, combined with polyurethane wheels, helped propel inline skating to peak popularity in the 1990s.

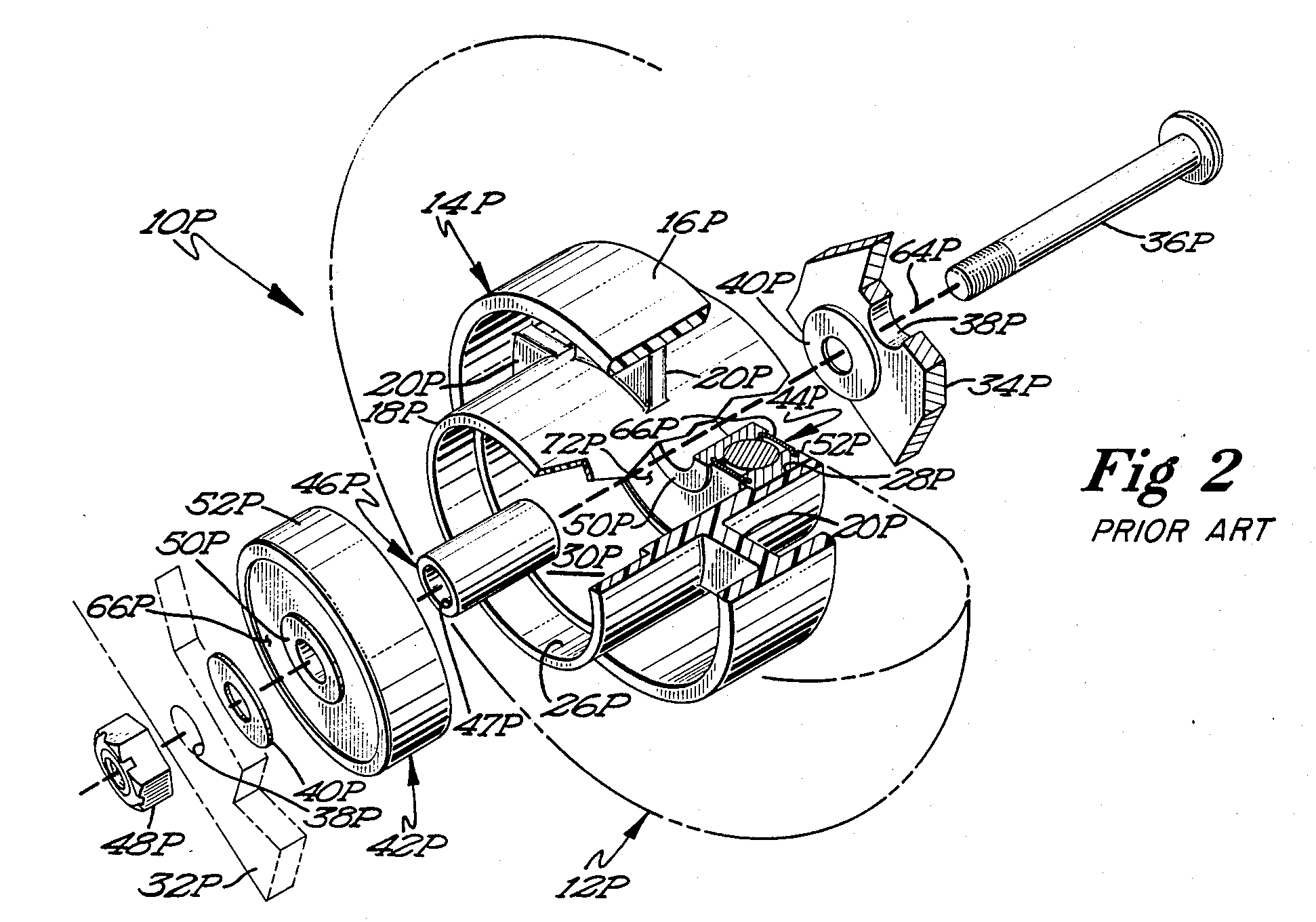
Bearings separate a wheel from the rest of the skate

Ball bearings separate the skate’s only moving parts, the wheels, from the non-moving structure. Wheels rotate around axles, which are bolted tightly to the frame. The frame is, in turns, firmly attached to the boot. Thus all non-moving parts of the skate remain fixed in place, securely connected using glue, rivets, welds, bolts, or other fastening methods. Bearings minimize friction between the wheel and the axle, allowing skaters to reach higher speeds with less effort. (Note: Consult sections on bearings, spacers, wheel assembly, and bearing preloading from the Big Wheel article.)

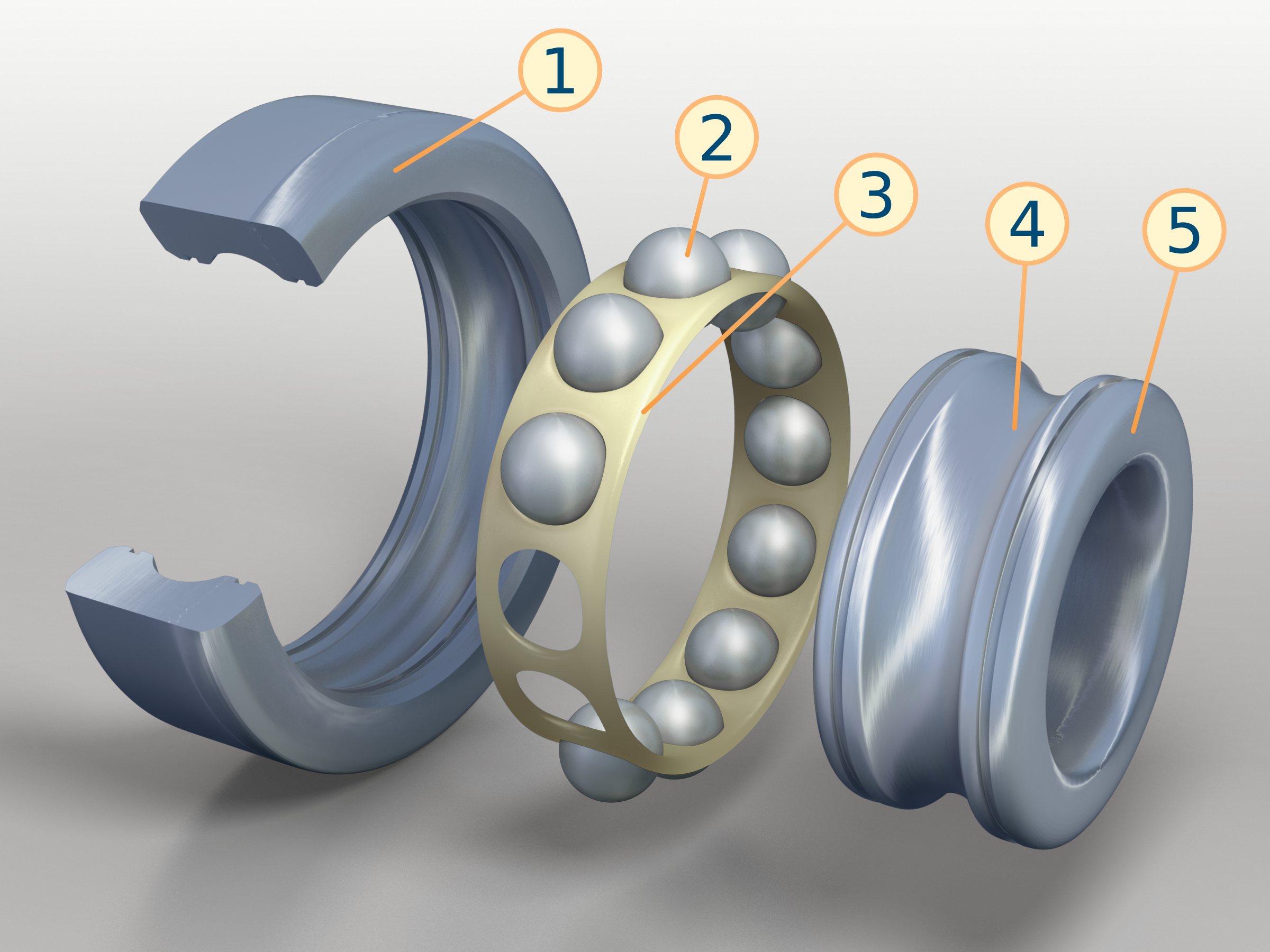
Bearing balls separate outer race from inner race

Bearings are precision-made to endure high-speed rotations. On flat terrain, a skater on 80 mm wheels can cruise at a speed of 20 km/h (12.4 mph). At that speed, the wheels, and thus the bearings, rotate at 1,326 revolutions per minute (RPM). To withstand the heat and stress of such speeds, bearings are typically made from durable materials like stainless steel, chrome steel, or ceramic.

A ball bearing consists of two concentric rings: an outer race and an inner race, separated by a set of rolling balls, usually between 5 and 8 in an ISO 608 bearing. The outer race is fixed to the wheel hub and rotates with it, while the inner race is fixed to the axle and remains stationary. Deep grooves are machined into the races to form raceways that securely hold the balls in place. A retainer, or cage, separates the balls and distributes them evenly along the raceways.

== Purpose-built ==
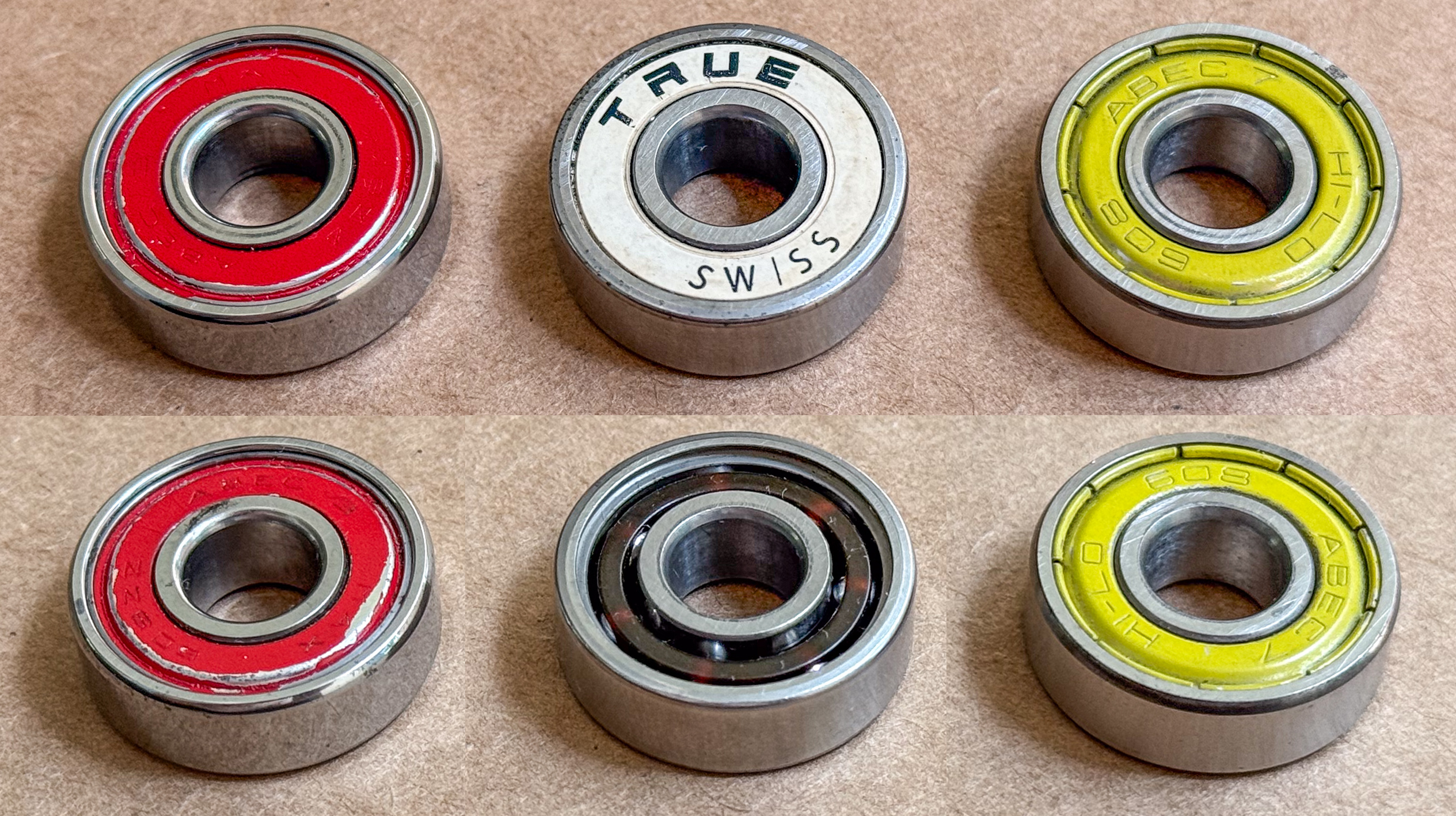
ILQ-style, Swiss-style, & unremovable

Bearings are commonly rated on the ABEC scale, which measures manufacturing precision tolerances, with ratings ranging from 1 (lowest) to 9 (highest) in odd numbers. Originally developed for high-speed industrial machinery, the ABEC scale does not consider material type, material quality, or durability - factors that significantly impact bearing performance in skates. It also ignores how bearing enclosures respond to dirt, moisture, and other real-world skating conditions. While higher ABEC ratings indicate better precision, they represent only one of many factors that determine a bearing’s suitability for inline skating.

ABEC precision ratings do not directly indicate how fast a bearing can safely spin. The actual maximum speed, called the mechanical limiting speed, depends on other factors such as materials, lubrication, load, and operating temperature. Manufacturers typically publish datasheets specifying the limiting speed for each tolerance class. For example, SKF, a Swedish bearing manufacturer, lists a limiting speed of 38,000 RPM for its ABEC 3-rated 608 bearings. That is more than sufficient for inline skating, considering that an average skater cruising on 80 mm wheels reaches only about 1,326 RPM, or 3.5% of the limiting speed. (Note: SKF’s 1,152-page rolling bearings catalog lists a limiting speed of 38,000 RPM for its Explorer-class 608-2Z bearings (pages 135 and 262). These bearings meet ISO 492 Class 6 precision tolerances, which are equivalent to ABEC 3, as noted on pages 7, 36, 248, and 250.)

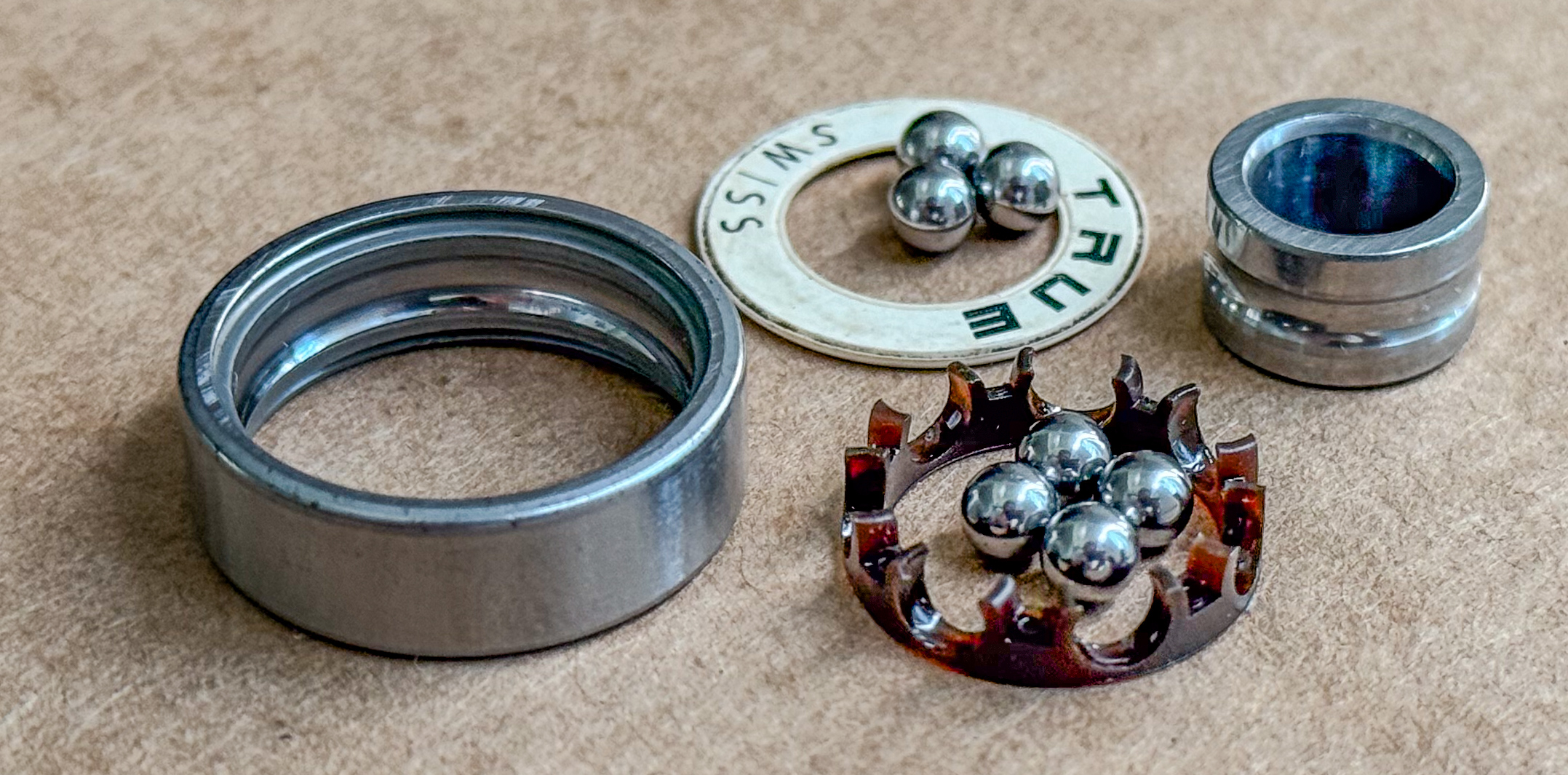
Bones Swiss can be disassembled

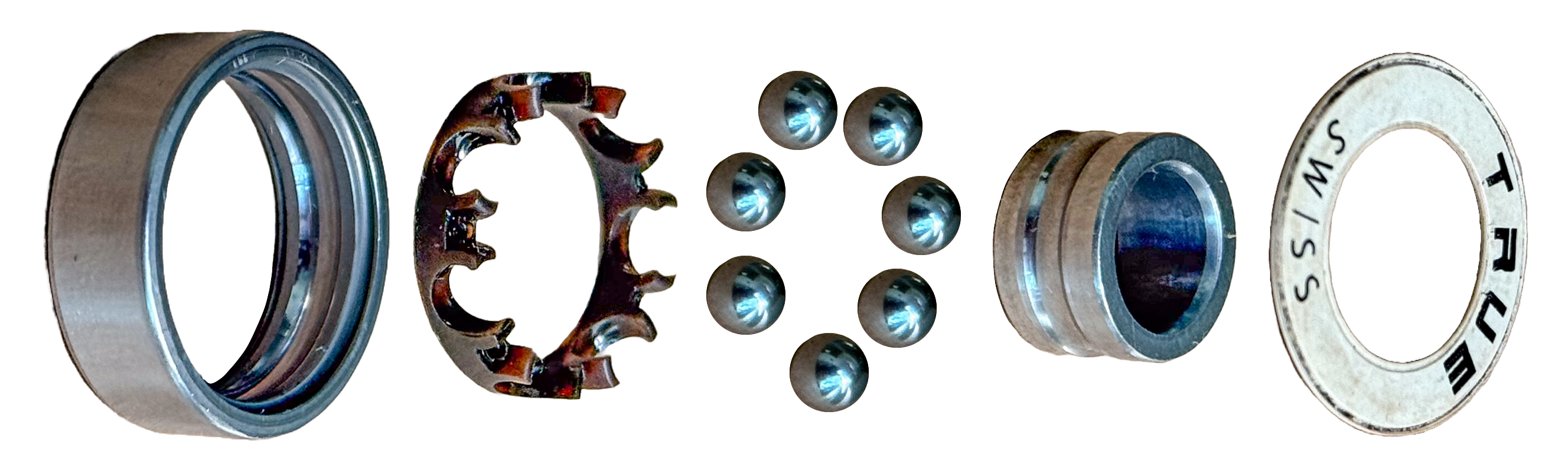
Structure of a Swiss-style bearing

Recognizing the unique demands that skating places on bearings, George Powell of Powell Peralta collaborated with a Swiss bearing manufacturer in the early 1980s to develop 608 bearings specifically tailored for skateboarding. Unlike conventional 608 bearings designed for electric motors operating in clean environments, these purpose-built bearings were engineered to better withstand multi-directional abuses from street skating. The outer-facing side featured a serviceable shield that could be easily pried open with a pin for cleaning, while the inner side was left open, as it sat protected within the wheel hub. Understanding that even high-precision bearings degrade when clogged with dirt, Powell replaced standard metal retainers with molded plastic ones, allowing skaters to temporarily remove these retainers to access and clean the balls and raceways. He also formulated a custom lubricant optimized for skating conditions. The result was the launch of Bones Swiss in 1983, a product that remains a gold standard for both skateboarders and inline skaters to this day.

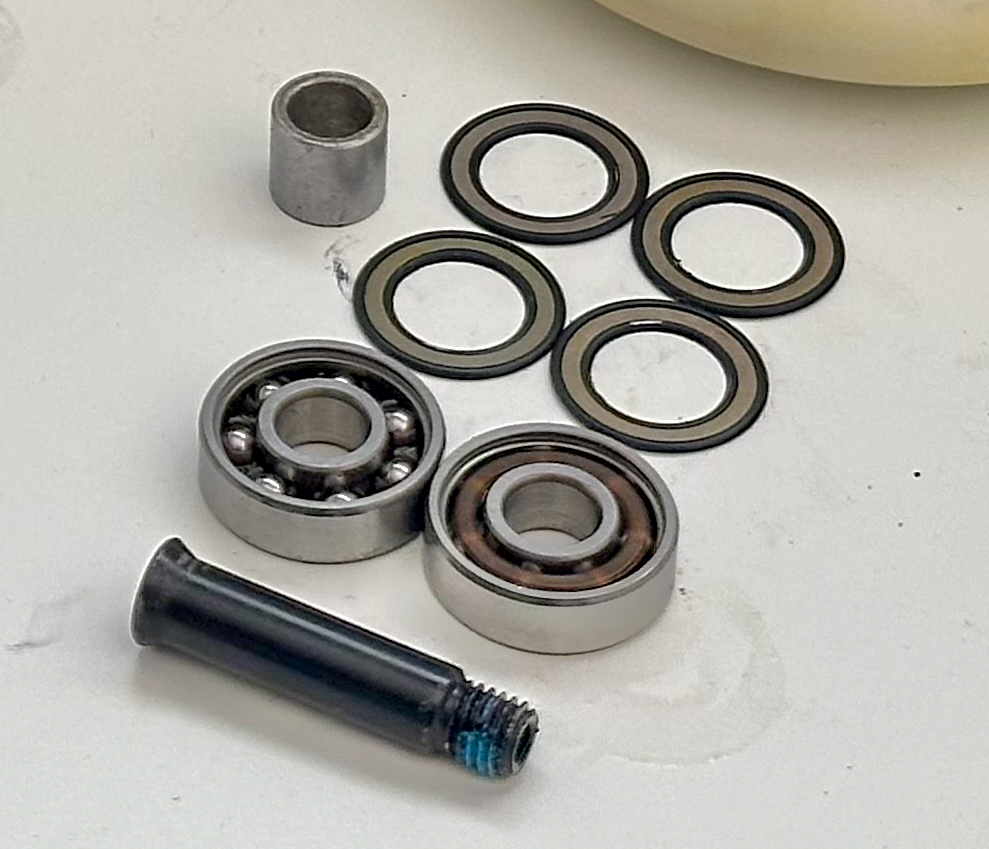
Inline Warehouse

Reputable skate bearing manufacturers generally avoid using ABEC ratings, as they do not reflect the engineering tailored specifically for skating. Instead, bearings are marketed under specialized product lines. For example, Bones Bearings offers models such as Bones Swiss, Bones Swiss Ceramic, Bones REDS®, and Bones Big Balls®. All of these are labeled Skate Rated™, indicating that every component is designed and tested with the demands of real skating in mind. Powell’s “Swiss” design and engineering has become an unofficial standard in the skating industry, with imitation brands offering bearings labeled Swiss that mimic the same structure and claimed quality, despite not being manufactured in Switzerland.

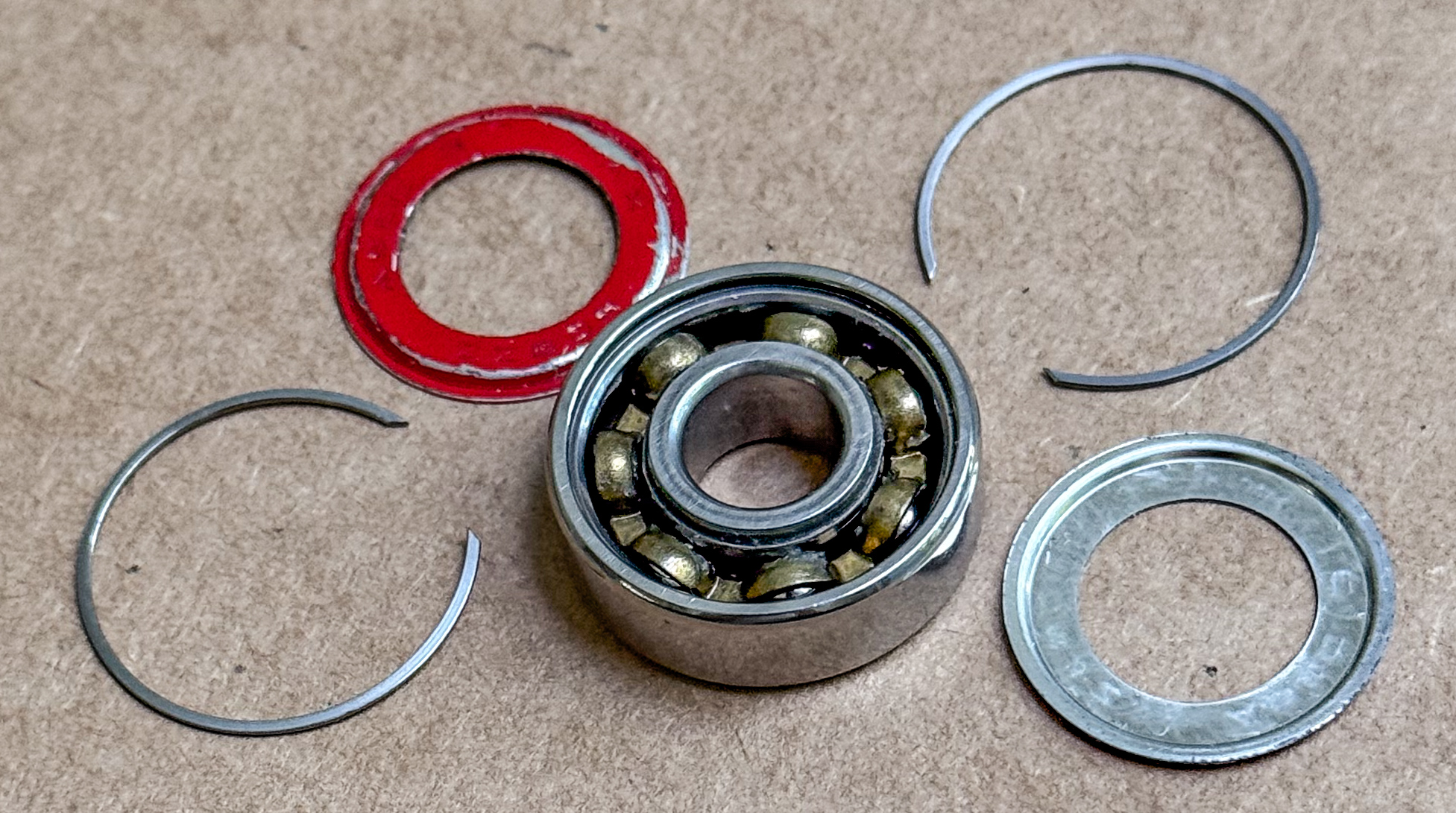
Bearing styled after TWINCAM ILQ-7

Similarly, TWINCAM bearings were developed in the early 1990s specifically for inline skating and were promoted with the slogan “Beyond ABEC”. In 1991, the company launched serviceable bearings featuring removable shields held in place with a C-clip, allowing for easier maintenance. The following year, it introduced TK CLASSIC Racing Gel, a water-repellent lubricant formulated for inline skating. In 2002, TWINCAM debuted the ILQ-9, a 6-ball bearing - an alternative to the standard 7-ball 608 bearings widely used at the time. The company later expanded the line with models such as ILQ-9 Pro with rubber shields, ILQ-7 with 7 balls (commonly found in OEM skates), ILQ-X mr2 with a 29% weight reduction, and ILQ-Midget with 11 balls. TWINCAM trademarked ILQ (InLine Qualified) as a proprietary quality rating system, positioning it as a specialized alternative to the ABEC scale. Various ILQ models are rebranded and distributed by major inline skate companies, including FR Skates, K2, Rollerblade, and Powerslide/Wicked.

== Contamination and friction ==
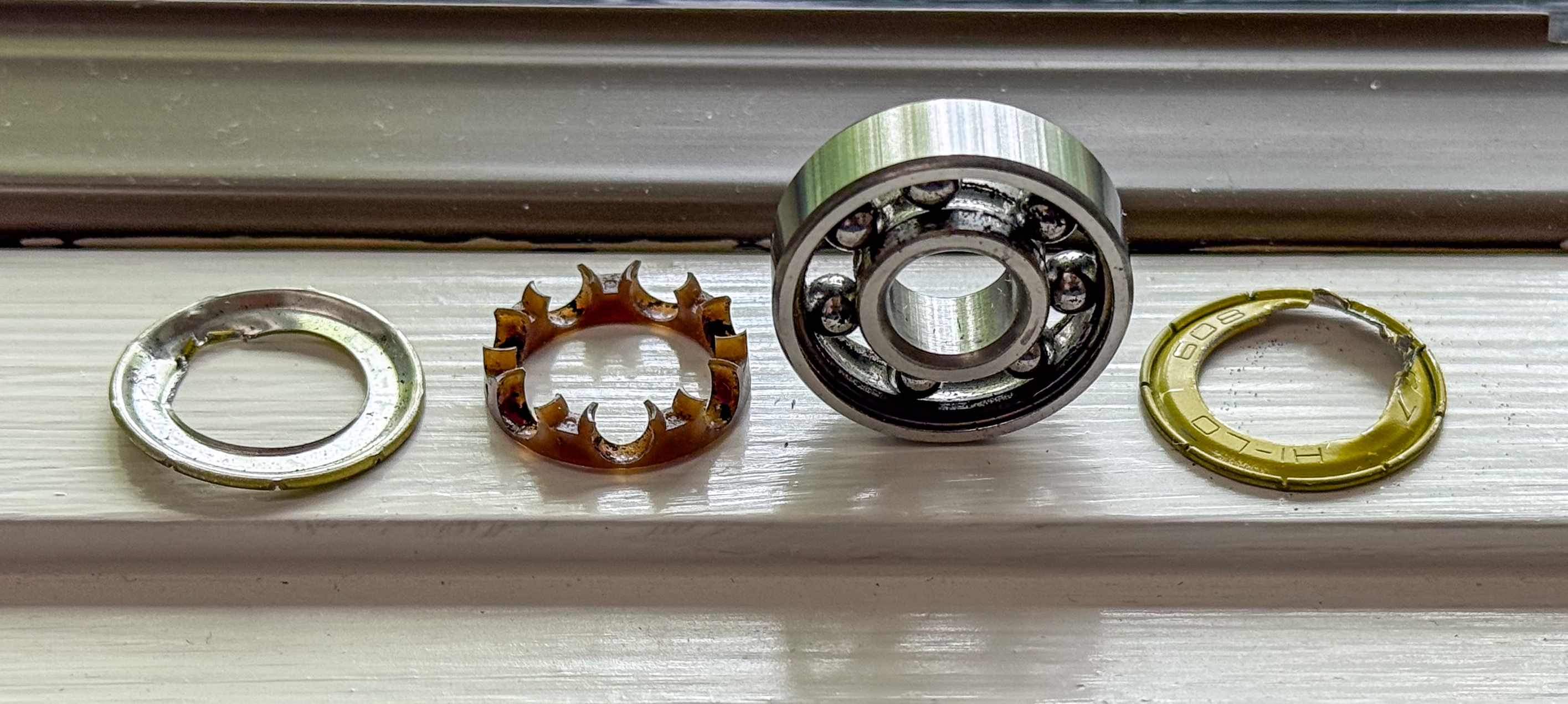
Disasembled ZZ gap shields

In addition to the rolling resistance generated by the wheels, skaters also experience energy loss due to bearing friction. As the outer race of a bearing rotates around the inner race, various internal components - such as the balls, cage, lubricant, raceways, and seals - dissipate energy through rolling friction, sliding contact, and viscous drag. Bearing friction encompasses all of these sources of energy loss.

In practice, however, bearing friction in clean, properly lubricated bearings is insignificant compared to the rolling resistance of polyurethane wheels. Purpose-built bearings from reputable brands usually meet or exceed ABEC 3 specifications. As a result, bearing selection has a comparatively small impact on overall performance for the majority of inline skaters, while bearings are still new and clean.

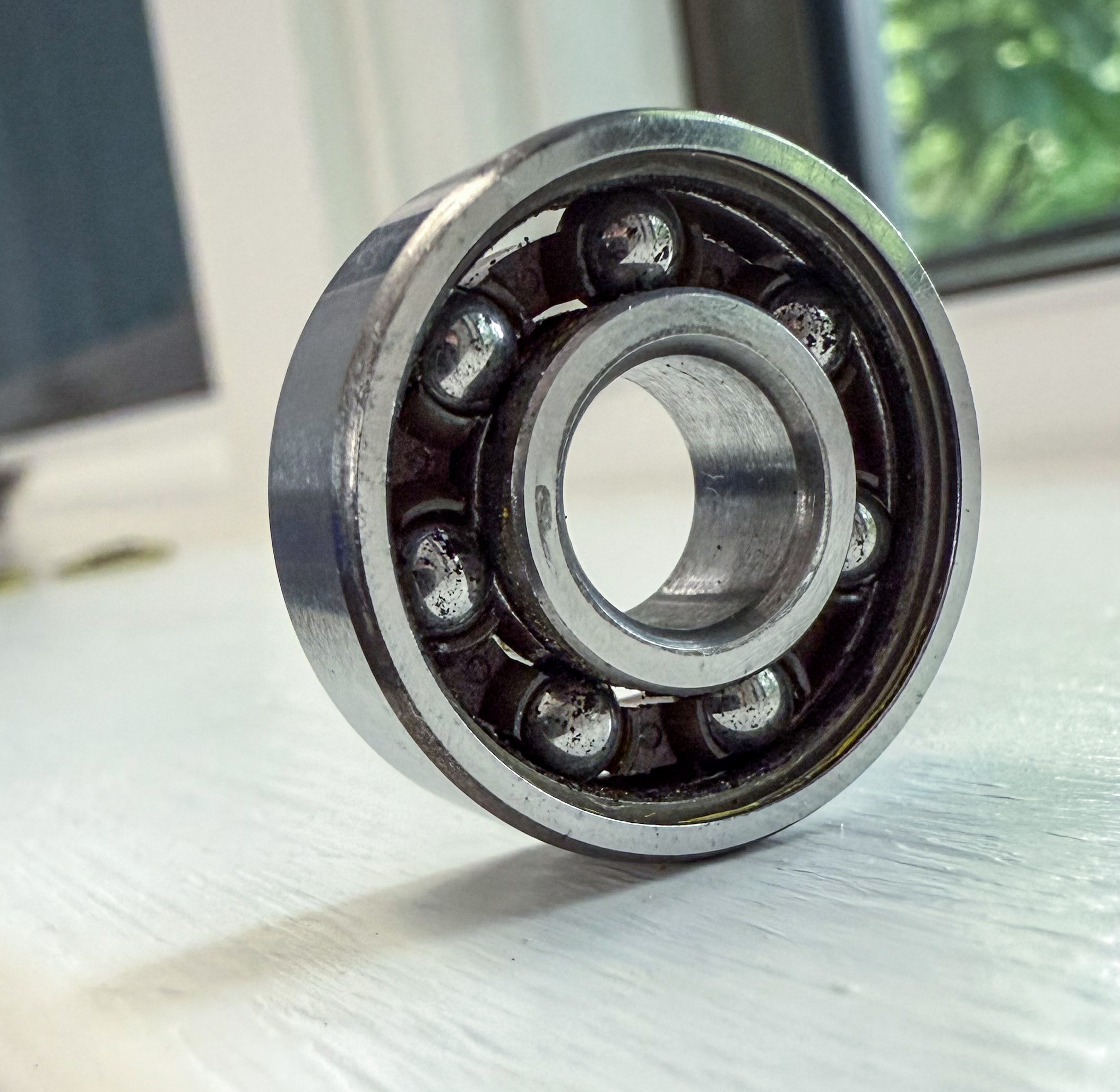
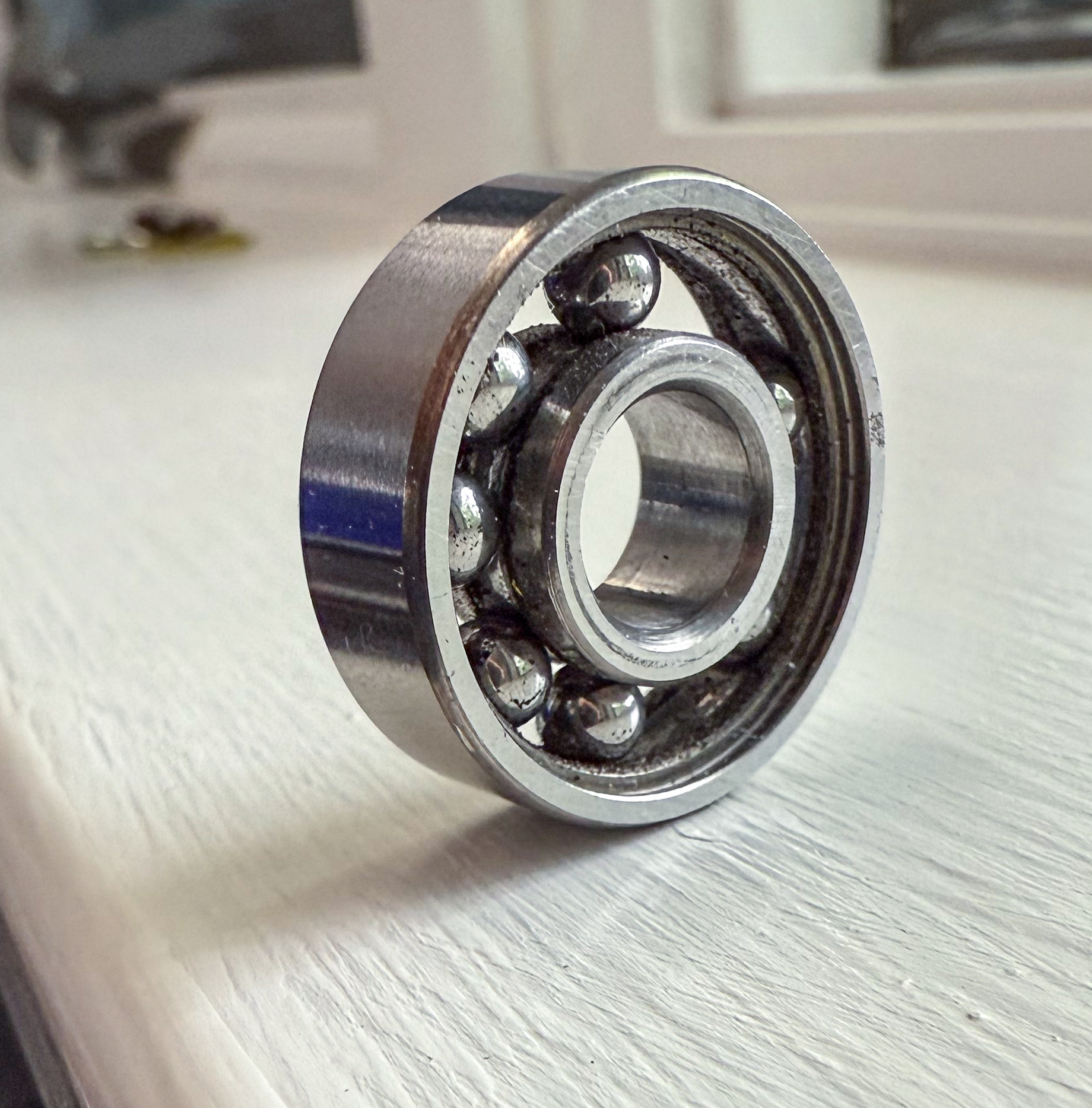
Dirt trapped inside a bearing

Bearing selection, however, plays a significant role in determining how long bearings perform efficiently and reliably as advertised, before requiring cleaning or replacement. This largely depends on the bearing’s ability to resist contamination from dirt, dust, and moisture. Even microscopic debris, such as particles the size of a human hair, can scratch raceways and interfere with smooth rotation. Among all factors affecting bearing performance, contamination is considered the most detrimental. It can significantly reduce efficiency, slow rotation, or in severe cases, cause the bearing to seize. Under such conditions, any theoretical performance advantages based on manufacturer specifications become irrelevant. Skaters often joke that the fastest bearings in the world are simply ones that are new or freshly cleaned and lubricated.

== Shields ==
Inline skate bearings are protected from external contamination primarily through the use of shields. While 608 bearings in general can employ various shield types, inline skating and skateboarding commonly use one of four: non-serviceable metal gap shields (Z), serviceable metal gap shields with a C-ring (ZS), serviceable rubber gap shields bonded to a metal insert (RS), and full-contact labyrinth rubber lip seals (RSL). (Note: Bearing shielding and sealing are designated by suffixes that vary between manufacturers. These designations are typically published in technical handbooks and catalogs. One NTN suffix conversion table can be found on page 178 of the Bearing Nomenclature Guide by BDS. There is no industry-wide standard that clearly defines when a "shield" becomes a "seal," nor where non-contact shields end and light-contact or non-contact seals begin. Likewise, the skating industry adopts suffixes inspired by those used in the bearing industry, but does not apply them consistently across brands. Generally, removable metal gap shields are labeled with the suffix "Z" in a fairly uniform way. See Rollerblade SG9 bearings (archived). C-ring mounted metal gap shields, popularized by TWINCAM, are rarely marked with a distinct suffix, but when they are, they follow the "ZS" convention used by SKF. The skating industry’s use of the "RS" suffix typically refers to a non-contact NBR shield that physically resembles the RS/2RS contact lip seals used by INA/Schaeffler, but instead leaves a narrow gap, similar to SKF’s non-contact "RZ" shields. The "RSL" suffix in skating refers to a full-contact labyrinth seal, comparable to SKF’s own RSL low-friction seals, except that SKF RSL leaves small gaps while bending the contamination path.)

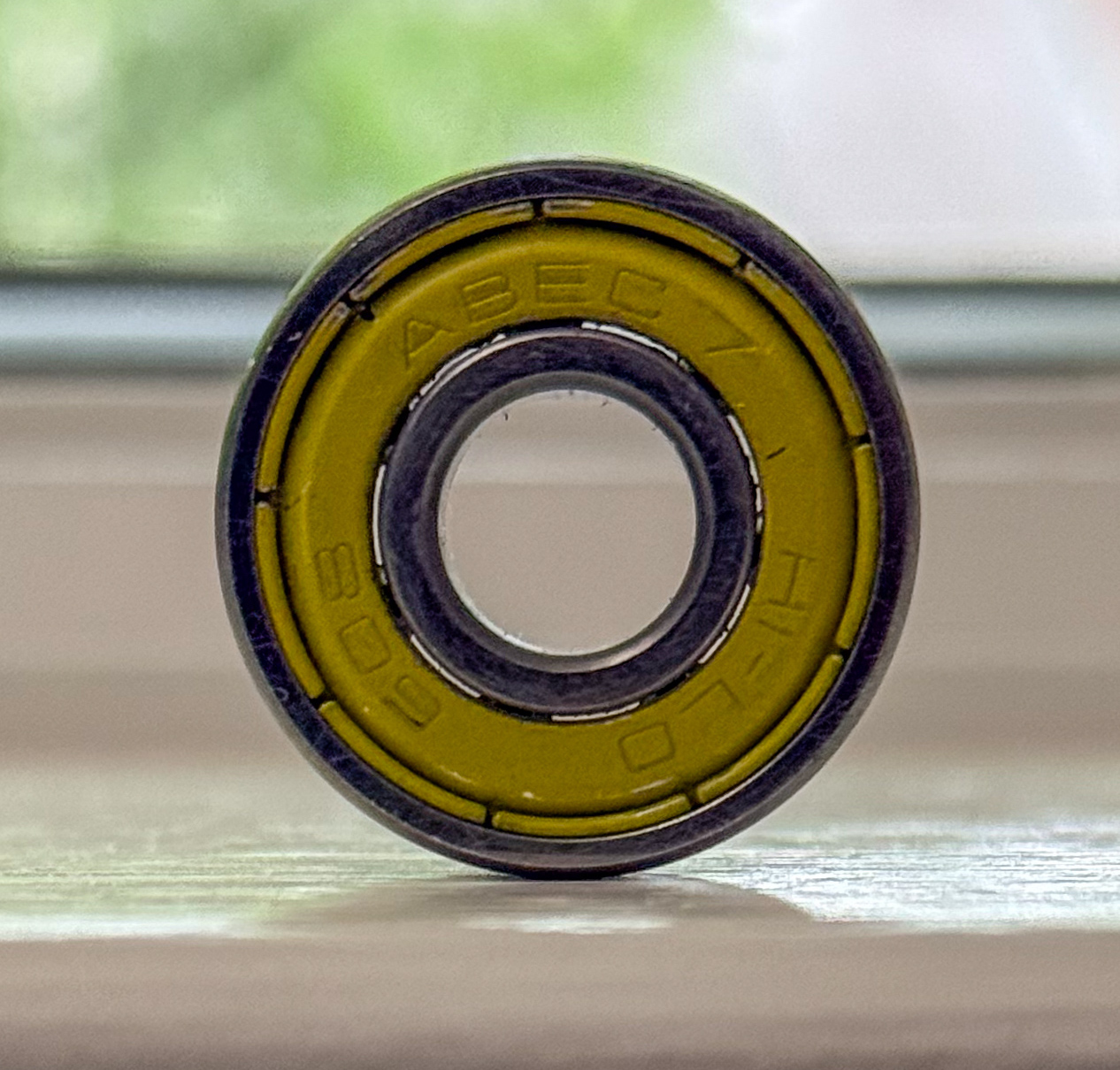
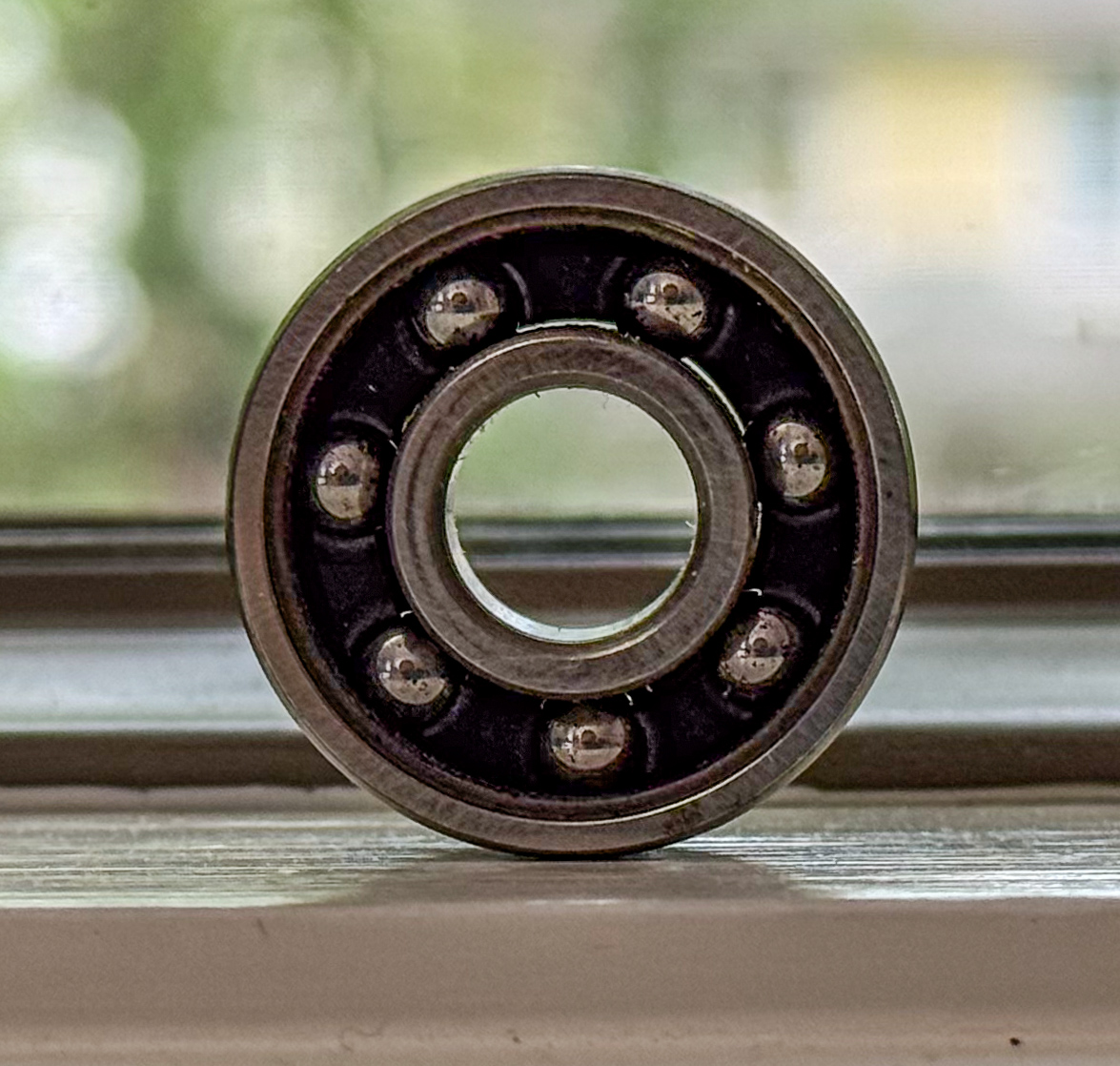
Gap between shield and inner race in a Z shield

Z Shields: Z-type metal shields are among the most common on 608 bearings. These simple metal shields are labeled "Z" by manufacturers and skate brands. They snap into a groove on the outer race and do not contact the inner race, leaving a small gap that prevents friction but allows dirt and moisture to enter. A non-contact gap shield allows the inner race to rotate freely without drags from the shield. Bearings shielded on both sides in this manner are designated "ZZ", and are non-serviceable, as the shields cannot be removed without being bent or deformed. Rollerblade SG bearings are typical examples of ZZ-shielded bearings.

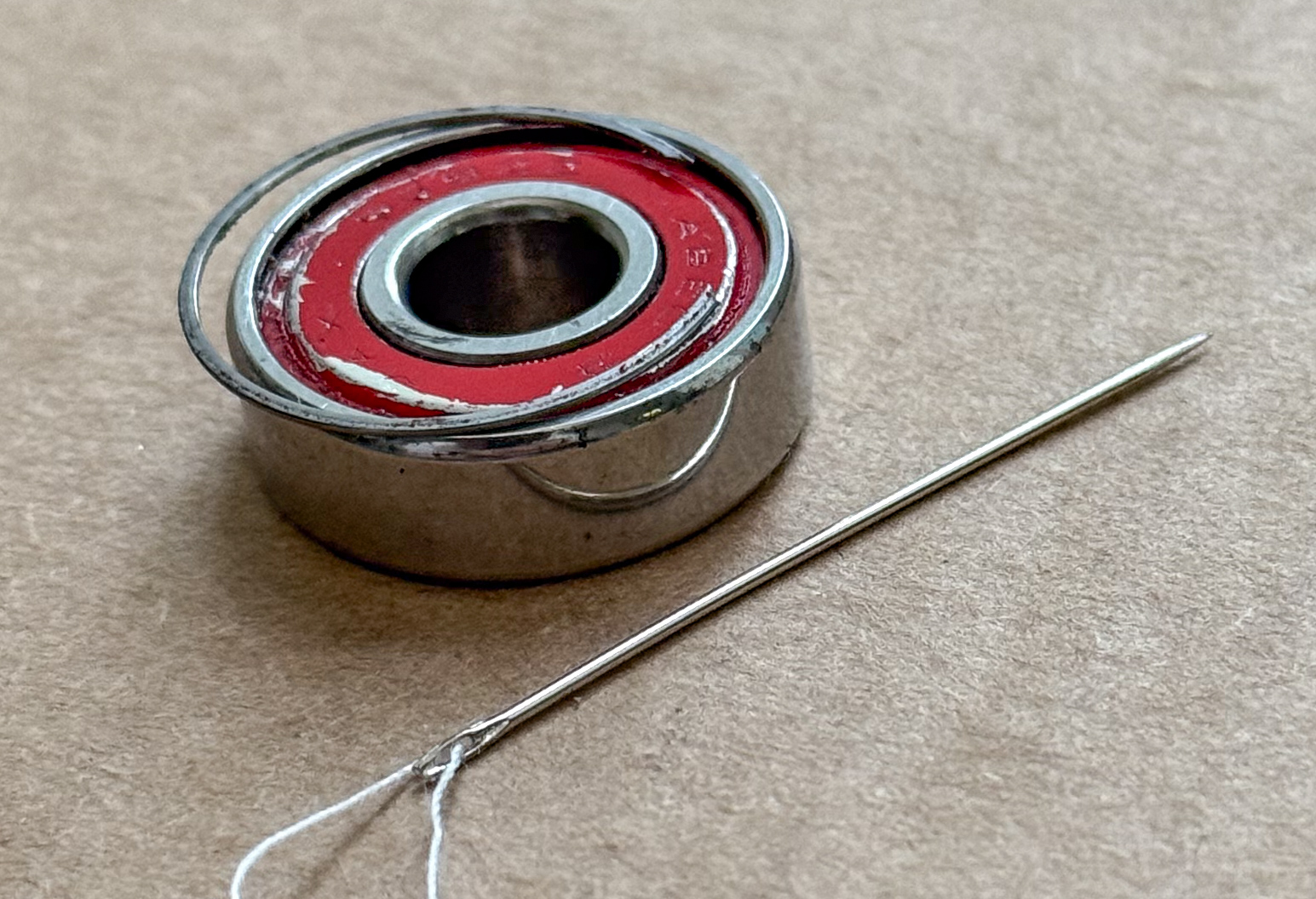
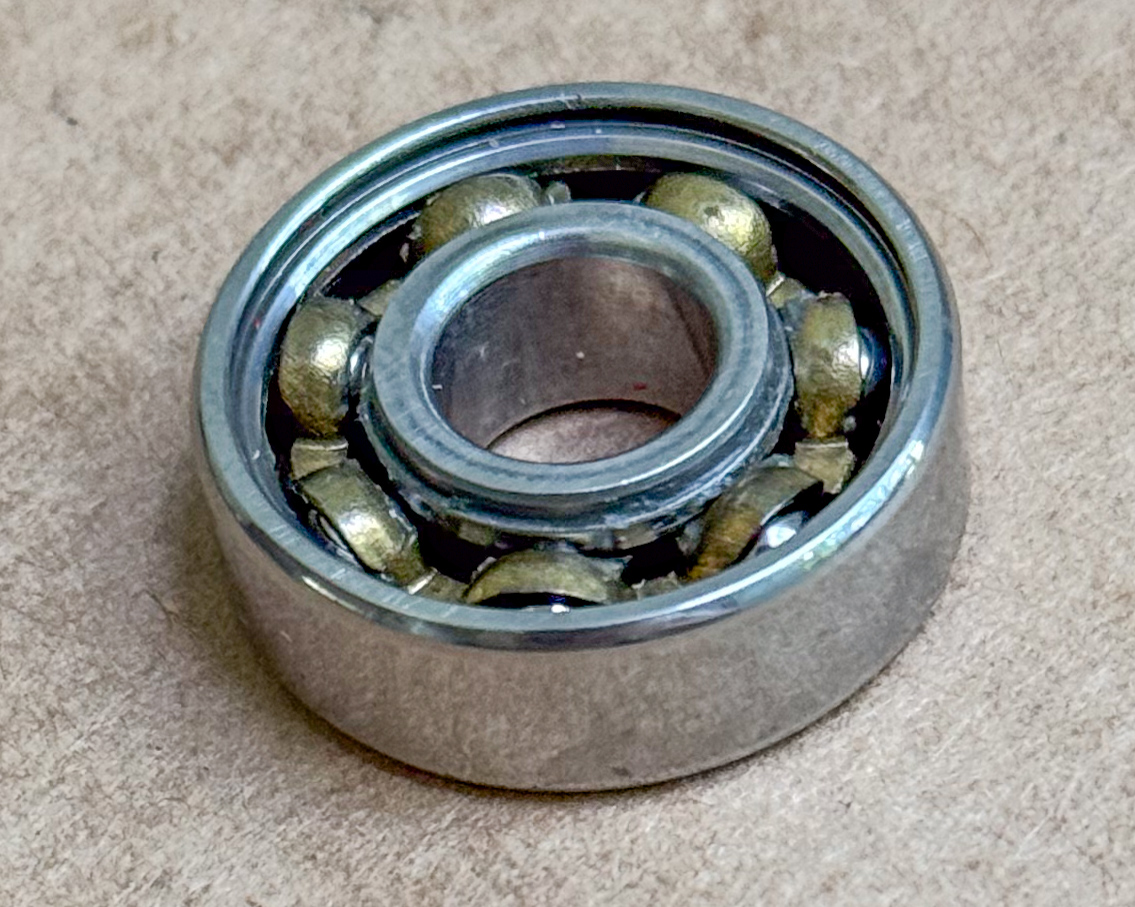
ZS shields released by removing the C-ring

ZS Shields: ZS metal shields are held in place by a removable C-clip (or C-ring) seated in the outer race. Bearings with this design on both sides are labeled "2ZS" or "ZZS". Like Z shields, ZS shields are non-contact and impose minimal drag on the bearing, but they offer limited protection against dirt and moisture, because of the gap. Their key advantage is serviceability: skaters can remove and reattach the shields without damage, enabling regular cleaning and relubrication to keep bearings working at top condition. SKF manufactures such bearings, and TWINCAM has made this shield style popular with its ILQ inline bearings.

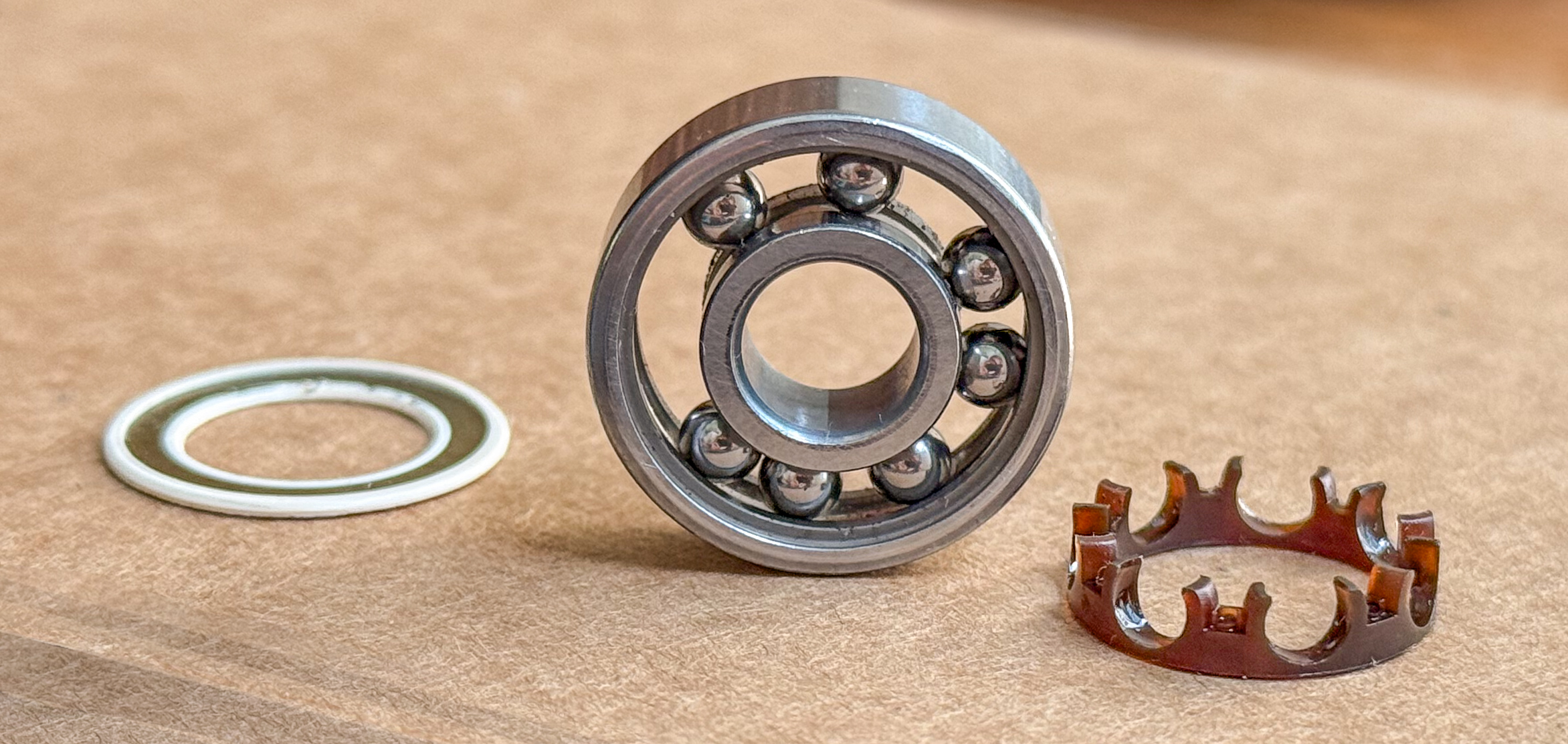
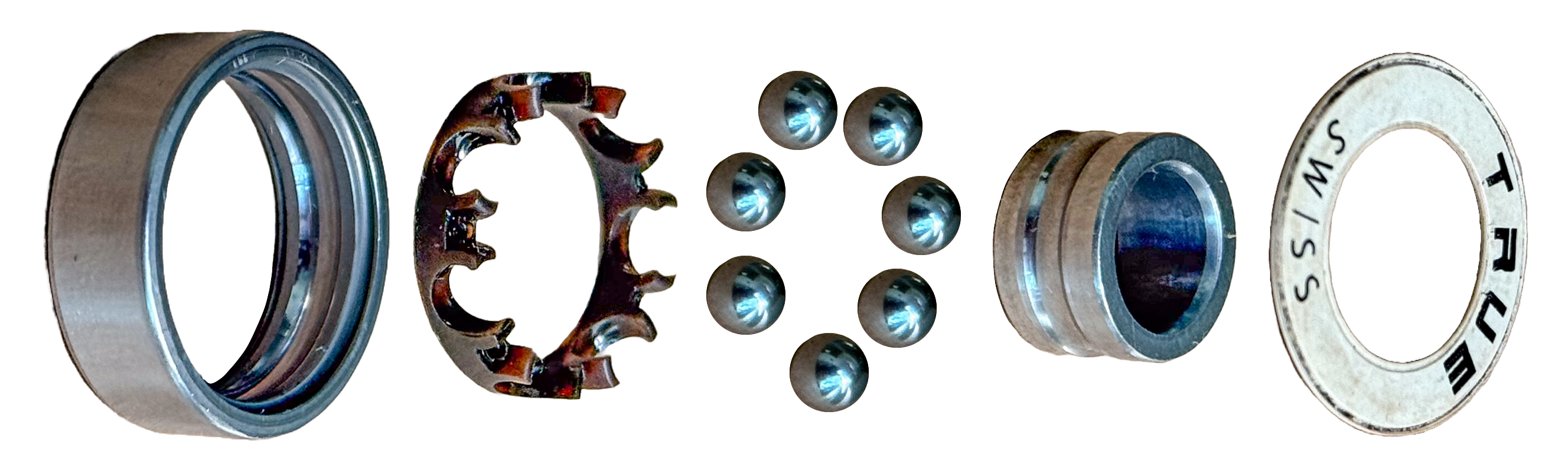
Typical single RS shield with removable retainer

RS Shields: In skating, RS rubber shields specifically refer to the style popularized by Bones Swiss. These consist of a nitrile rubber shield bonded to a metal insert. The shield snaps into the outer race and can be pried off for maintenance. RS shields are non-contact and offer improved protection over Z and ZS shields, particularly against microscopic particles. However, moisture can still penetrate and cause corrosion. Many popular skate brands avoid double-shielded 2RS bearings and instead use a single RS shield, leaving the opposite face of the bearing open for ease of maintenance. This open side is positioned inward when mounted inside the wheel hub, which effectively protects it from external debris. This configuration allows skaters to remove the plastic retainer and lubricate the bearing balls without needing to remove two shields, providing both protection and convenient access for servicing.

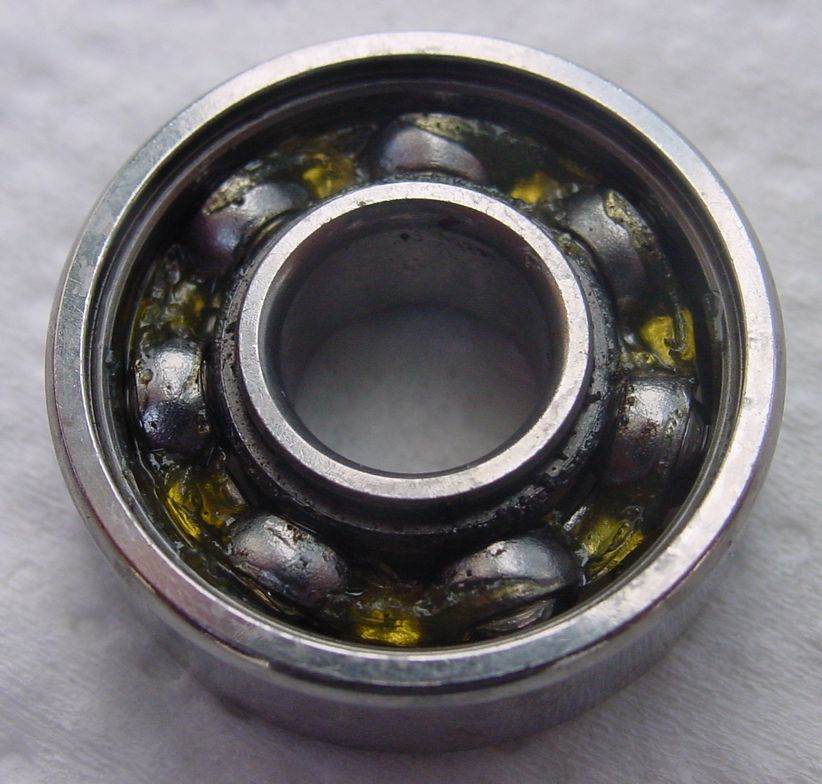
Bearing packed with heavy grease

RSL Seals: Full-contact labyrinth rubber seals (RSL) represent a stark departure from non-contact shield designs. These seals feature a lip with a labyrinth-shaped profile lightly touching a surface of the inner race. This configuration effectively seals out not only dirt but also moisture. Typical bearings with non-contact shields use light oil as a lubricant, since grease tends to trap any debris that makes it past the shield, accelerating internal wear. Bearings with RSL seals, however, are far more resistant to contaminants, allowing them to be packed with heavy, viscous grease. This grease provides longer-lasting lubrication and superior protection in sealed environments compared to the lighter oil formulations used in non-contact shielded designs.

RSL-sealed bearings are designed for near-zero maintenance, with the tradeoff being increased bearing drag. Contact seals alone can account for about 60% of total bearing friction, with an additional 30% from the viscous grease, and only 10% from rolling friction between the balls, cage, and raceways. In addition, Heavily greased bearings do not spin freely when unloaded. However, when subjected to a skater’s full body weight, the pressure forces the grease out of the ball paths, enabling smooth and efficient wheel rotation under load. Dragon Bearings offers several 2RSL models featuring full-contact labyrinth seals on both sides of the bearing.
