= Ball (bearing) =

Machine component most commonly used as the rolling element in ball bearings

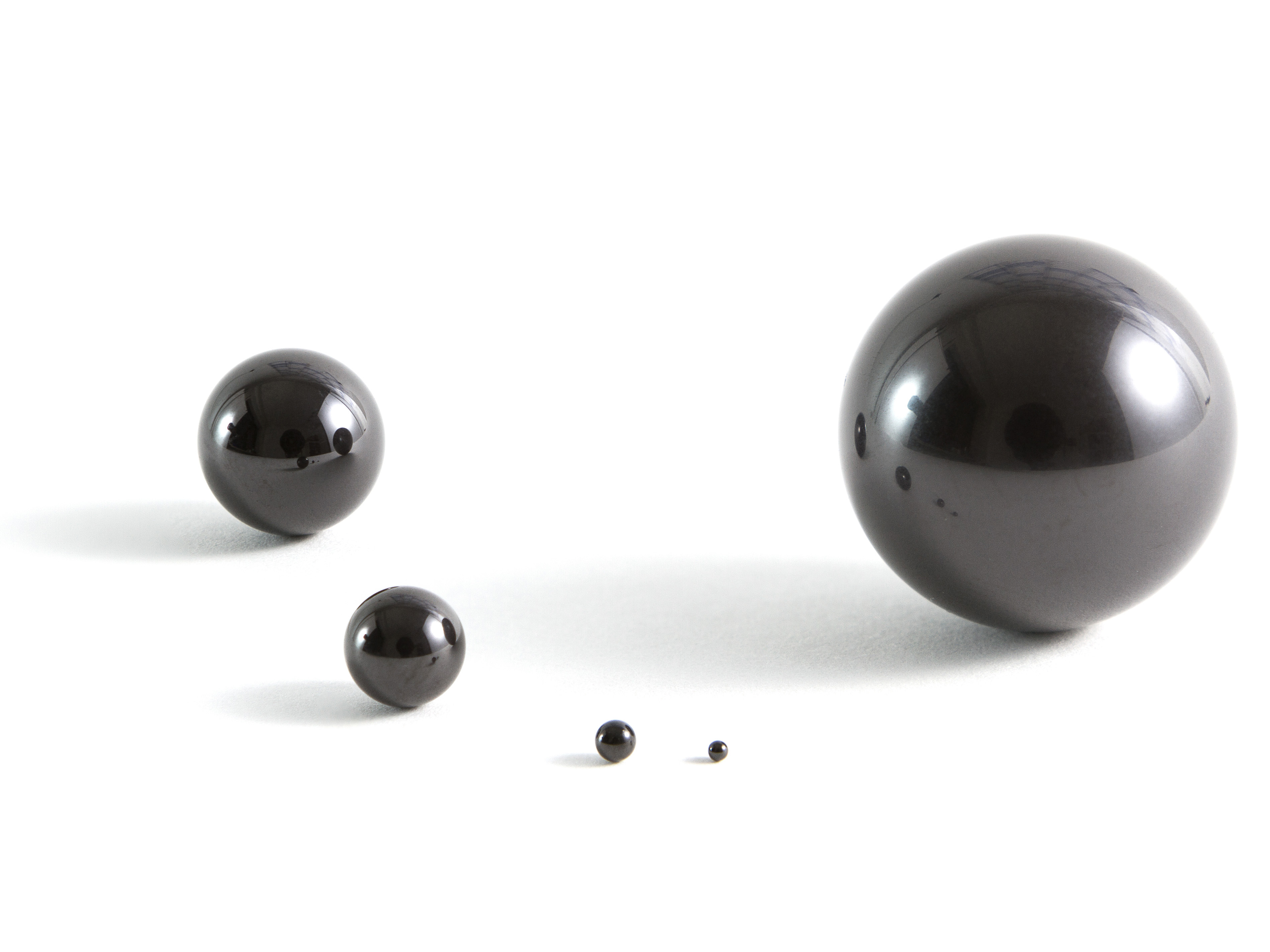
Silicon nitride bearing balls, in diameters ranging from 1 to 20mm

Bearing balls are special highly spherical and smooth balls, most commonly used in ball bearings, but also used as components in things like freewheel mechanisms. The balls themselves are commonly referred to as ball bearings. This is an example of a synecdoche. The balls come in many different grades. These grades are defined by bodies such as the American Bearing Manufacturers Association (ABMA), a body which sets standards for the precision of bearing balls. They are manufactured in machines designed specially for the job.

In 2008, the United States produced 5.778 billion bearing balls.

== Grade ==
Bearing balls are manufactured to a specific grade, which defines its geometric tolerances. The grades range from 2000 to 3, where the smaller the number the higher the precision. Grades are written "GXXXX", i.e. grade 100 would be "G100". Lower grades also have fewer defects, such as flats, pits, soft spots, and cuts. The surface smoothness is measured in two ways: surface roughness and waviness.

Size refers to the farthest possible distance between two points on the ball's surface, as measured by two parallel plates in contact with the surface. The starting size is the nominal ball diameter, which is the nominal, or theoretical, ball diameter. The ball size is then determined by measuring the ball diameter variation, which is the difference between the largest and smallest diameter measurement. For a given lot there is a lot diameter variation, which is the difference between the mean diameter of the largest ball and the smallest ball of the lot.

Sphericity refers to the amount of deviation from a true spherical form (out of roundness). This is measured by rotating a ball against a linear transducer with a gauge force of less than 4 grams (0.14 oz). The resulting polar graph is then circumscribed with the smallest circle possible and the difference between this circumscribed circle and the nominal ball diameter is the variation.

Grade tolerances for metric sizes
Grade	Sphericity [mm]	Lot diameter variation [mm]	Nominal ball diameter tolerance [mm]	Maximum surface roughness (Ra) [μm]
3	0.00008	0.00008	±0.0008	0.012
5	0.00013	0.00013	±0.0013	0.02
10	0.00025	0.00025	±0.0013	0.025
25	0.0006	0.0006	±0.0025	0.051
50	0.0012	0.0012	±0.0051	0.076
100	0.0025	0.0025	±0.0127	0.127
200	0.005	0.005	±0.025	0.203
1000	0.025	0.025	±0.127	

Grade tolerances for inch sizes
Grade	Size range [in]	Sphericity [in]	Lot diameter variation [in]	Nominal ball diameter tolerance [in]	Maximum surface roughness (Ra) [μin]
3	0.006–2	0.000003	0.000003	±0.00003	0.5
5	0.006–6	0.000005	0.000005	±0.00005	0.8
10	0.006–10	0.00001	0.00001	±0.0001	1.0
25	0.006–10	0.000025	0.000025	±0.0001	2.0
50	0.006–10	0.00005	0.00005	±0.0003	3.0
100	0.006–10	0.0001	0.0001	±0.0005	5.0
200	0.006–10	0.0002	0.0002	±0.001	8.0
1000	0.006–10	0.001	0.001	±0.005	

== Manufacturing ==
The manufacturing of bearing balls depends on the type of material from which the balls are made.

=== Metal ===
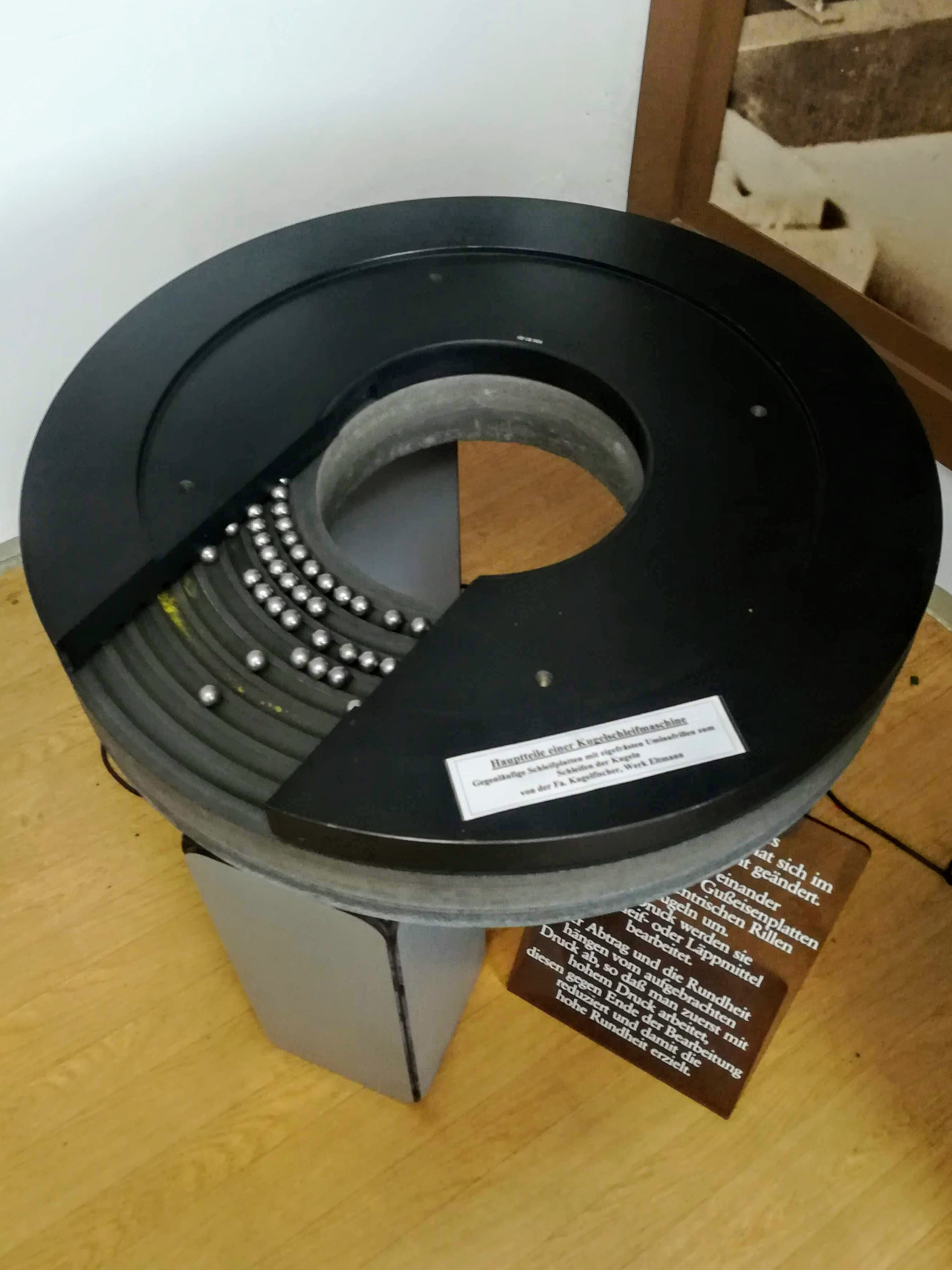
Rill plates

Metal balls start as a wire. The wire is sheared to give a pellet with a volume approximately that of the ball with the desired outer diameter (OD). This pellet is then headed into a rough spherical shape. Next, the balls are fed into a machine that de-flashes them and removes any excess material for a smooth surface. The machine works by moving the balls between two heavy cast iron or hardened steel plates, called rill plates. One of the plates is held stationary, while the other rotates. The top plate has an opening to allow balls to enter and exit the rill plates. These plates have fine circumferential grooves that the balls travel in. The balls are run through the machine long enough so that each ball passes through many of these grooves, which ensures each ball is exactly the same size, even if a particular groove is out of specification. The controllable machine variables are the amount of pressure applied, the speed at which the plates move, and how long the balls stay in the machine.

During the operation, coolant is pumped in between the rill plates because the high pressure between the plates and friction generates considerable heat. The high pressure applied to the balls also induces cold working, which helps to strengthen the balls.

Sometimes the balls are then run through a soft grinding process afterward to improve precision. This is done by the same type of machine, but the rill plates are replaced with grinding stones.

If the balls are steel, they are then heat treated. After heat treatment, they are descaled to remove any residue or by-products.

The balls are then hard ground. They are ground in the same type of machine as used before, but either an abrasive is introduced into the coolant or the rotating plate is replaced with a very hard fine-grain grinding wheel. This step can get the balls within ±0.0001 in (0.0025 mm). If the balls need more precision, then they are lapped, again in the same type of machine. However, this time the rill plates are made of a softer material, usually cast iron, less pressure is applied, the plate is rotated slowly. This step is what gives bearing balls their shiny appearance and can bring the balls between grades 10 and 48.

If even more precision is needed, then proprietary chemical and mechanical processes are usually used.

The inspection of bearing balls was one of the case studies in Frederick Winslow Taylor's classic Principles of Scientific Management.

=== Plastic ===
Plastic bearing balls are made using the same method as described above for metal bearing balls.

=== Ceramic ===
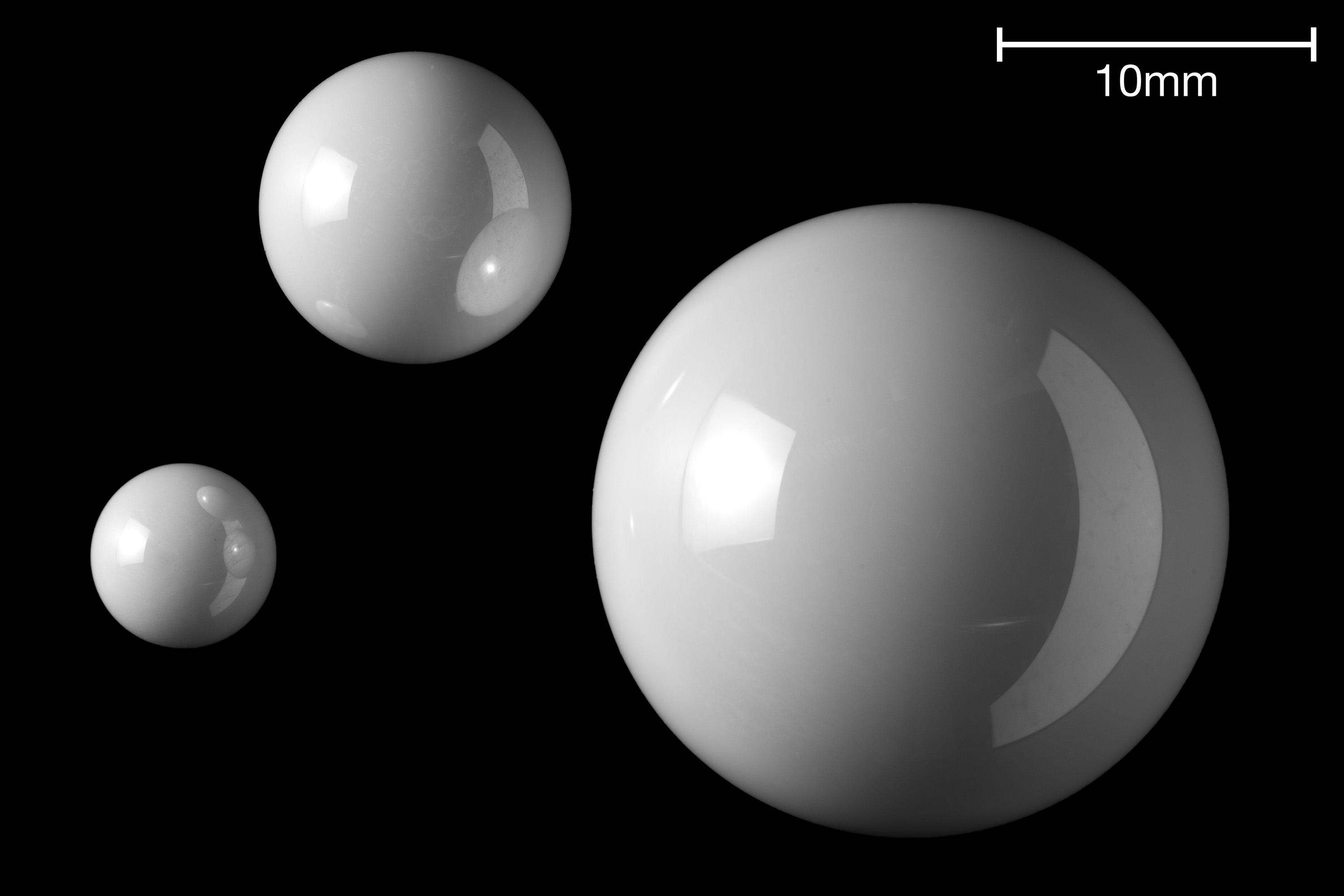
Zirconium dioxide ZrO_{2} bearing balls

Ceramic bearing balls are made of sintered materials that are then ground to size and shape using the same processes described above. Common materials include silicon nitride (Si_{3}N_{4}) and zirconium dioxide (ZrO_{2}).

== Materials ==
Common materials include carbon steel, stainless steel, chrome steel, brass, aluminium, tungsten carbide, platinum, gold, titanium, plastic. Other less common materials include copper, monel, k-monel, lead, silver, glass, and niobium.

Material comparison for common bearing balls
Material	UNS 52100	Stainless steel 440C	M50	BG-42	REX-20	440NDUR	Haynes 25	Si_{3}N_{4}	BeCu	455	C276
Hardness [HRC]	60	58	62	62	66	60	50	70	40	50	40
Temperature limit [°F]	300	300	400	400	600	300	1200	1500	400	500	1000
Corrosion resistance (Note: Where 1 is the lowest and 5 is the highest)	1	3	1	2	1	4	5	5	1	4	5
Cost	1	1	1	2	3	1	5	5	3	2	4
Availability	1	1	2	2	2	4	5	3	3	2	4
Magnetic	Magnetic	Magnetic	Magnetic	Magnetic	Magnetic	Magnetic	Non-magnetic	Non-magnetic	Non-magnetic	Magnetic	Magnetic
Electrical Conductivity	Conductive	Conductive	Conductive	Conductive	Conductive	Conductive	Conductive	Non-conductive	Conductive	Conductive	Conductive
Size limit	None	None	None	None	None	None	1.5 in (38 mm)	No Torque Tube	None	None	5 in (130 mm)
Relative load capacity	3	2	4	4	5	3	1	5	1	1	1
Relative fatigue life	3	2	4	4	5	3	1	5	1	1	1

== See also ==
- Steel shot
