= American Bearing Manufacturers Association =

U.S. industry trade group

ABMA
- Predecessor: AFBMA
- Established: 1917
- Type: Industry trade group
- Professional title: American Bearing Manufacturers Association
- Headquarters: Washington DC
- Region served: USA
- Members: 24 manufacturers of various types of bearings and 17 supplier members
- Key people: President Cheryl Caulfield
- Website: www.americanbearings.org

The American Bearing Manufacturers Association is an industry trade group that deals with all aspects of bearing technology.

== History ==
It was founded in 1917 as an informal group of manufacturers with the purpose of aiding bearing manufacturing during World War I. 1933 saw the ratification of Articles of Incorporation, by the then current members, as the Anti-Friction Bearing Manufacturers Association (AFBMA). In 1934 the AFBMA was incorporated as an organization in New York City.

In 1993 the organization formally changed its title to the American Bearing Manufacturers Association in order to better serve its members and to expand membership eligibility.

== See also ==
- ABEC scale - a tolerance classification developed by the ABMA's Annular Bearing Engineering Committee
- Ball (bearing)
