= ABEC scale =

Industrial scale for bearing tolerance

The ABEC scale is an industry accepted standard for the tolerances of a ball bearing. The ABEC scale is designed to provide bearing manufacturers dimensional specifications that meet the standards of precision bearings in a specified class. The scale is also used by manufacturers who produce equipment that require bearings must also know the dimensional tolerances to design parts that will accommodate a bearing.

== History ==
It was developed by the Annular Bearing Engineering Committee (ABEC) of the American Bearing Manufacturers Association (ABMA).

== Tolerance classes ==
There are five classes, which are named using the first five odd numbers:

- 1 (widest tolerance)
- 3
- 5
- 7
- 9 (tightest tolerance)

The naming scheme is inverse with the tolerance, i.e. higher numbers mean lower tolerance. The higher ABEC classes (lower tolerance) provide better precision, efficiency, and the possibility of greater speed capabilities, but do not necessarily allow the components to spin faster.

Bearings which fulfill the least strict class (ABEC 1) can be referred to as "precision" (precise) bearings. Bearings not conforming to at least ABEC 1 cannot be classified as precision bearings because their tolerances are too loose.

== Use ==
Outside the industrial uses mentioned, the scale may also work as a guide for consumers to make informed decisions about the type of bearing they desire. However, the ABEC scale itself does not inform anything about other critical factors related to materials, manufacturing, and performance.

High ABEC-rated bearings are intended for precision applications such as aircraft instruments or surgical equipment. Lower graded bearings are intended for the vast majority of applications such as vehicles, mechanical hobbies, roller skates, skateboards, fishing reels and industrial machinery. High ABEC rated bearings allow optimal performance of critical applications requiring very high revolutions per minute and smooth operation.

=== Illustration of bearing tolerances ===
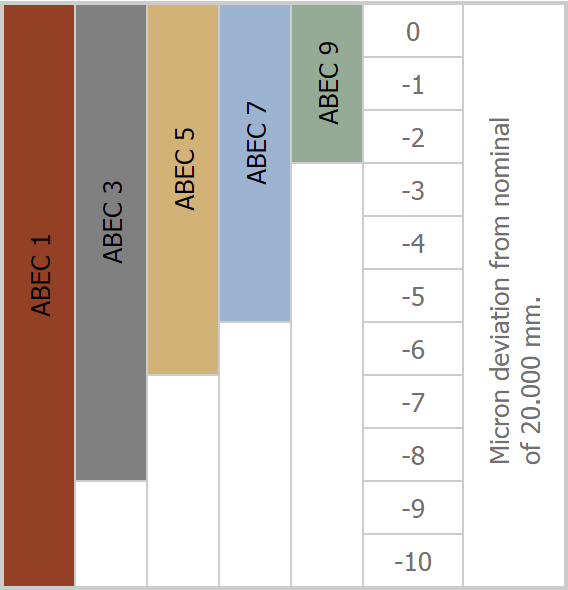
Illustration of bearing tolerances (in micrometers) for a bearing with a 20 mm inner diameter

For illustration, the figure shows the differences in tolerance per ABEC class in micrometers (μm) for a 20 mm inner diameter bearing. A 20 mm ABEC 7 bearing only has a 5 μm tolerance window, whereas an ABEC 1 has twice as wide a tolerance.

Often significant is also the maximum runout of the race on the inner ring, as this determines how far the axle may shift dynamically from its center position when rotating. For axle diameters between 1 and 18 mm, for the various ABEC classes, they are:

- ABEC 1: 10 µm
- ABEC 3: 7 µm
- ABEC 5: 4 µm
- ABEC 7: 2.5 µm
- ABEC 9: 1.5 µm.

== Correspondence with ISO 492 ==
The International Organization for Standardization (ISO) equivalent standard is ISO 492. The German equivalent is DIN 620. The Japanese equivalent is JIS B1514.

| ABEC | ISO 492 | DIN 620 | JIS B1514 |
|---|---|---|---|
| ABEC 1 | normal class 6X | P0 | Class 0 |
| ABEC 3 | class 6 | P6 | Class 6 |
| ABEC 5 | class 5 | P5 | Class 5 |
| ABEC 7 | class 4 | P4 | Class 4 |
| ABEC 9 | class 2 | P2 | Class 2 |

== Weaknesses of the specification ==
The ABEC rating does not specify many critical factors, such as load handling capabilities, ball precision, materials, material Rockwell hardness, degree of ball and raceway (cone) polishing, noise, vibration, and lubricant. Due to these factors, a high-quality ABEC 3 classified bearing could actually perform better than a lower-quality bearing which satisfies (the stricter) ABEC 7 requirement.
